This is a list of films and miniseries that are based on actual events. All films on this list are from American production unless indicated otherwise.

2000 
 A Father's Choice (2000) – made-for-television drama film about two sisters who are accustomed with the fast-paced life in the big city being forced to live with their father in the country when their mother is killed, loosely based on a true story
 Ali: An American Hero (2000) – made-for-television biographical sports-drama film chronicling portions of the career of heavyweight boxer Muhammad Ali
 All-American Girl: The Mary Kay Letourneau Story (2000) – made-for-television crime drama film based on Mary Kay Letourneau's illicit affair with one of her sixth grade students
 Almost Famous (2000) – comedy-drama film based on Cameron Crowe's early life, telling the coming-of-age story of a teenage journalist writing for Rolling Stone magazine while covering a fictitious rock band named Stillwater
 American Tragedy (2000) – made-for-television crime drama film based on the O. J. Simpson murder case for the 1994 murder of his ex-wife, Nicole Brown Simpson, and her friend, Ron Goldman
 The Audrey Hepburn Story (2000) – made-for-television biographical drama film based on the life of British actress and humanitarian Audrey Hepburn
 Bawandar (2000) – Indian Hindi-language crime drama film based on the true story of Bhanwari Devi, a rape victim from Rajasthan, India
 The Beach Boys: An American Family (2000) – biographical miniseries depicting a dramatization of the early years of The Beach Boys
 Beat (2000) – biographical drama film focusing primarily on the last weeks of writer Joan Vollmer's life in 1951 Mexico City, leading up to her accidental killing by her husband, the writer William S. Burroughs
 Before Night Falls (2000) – biographical romantic drama film based on both the autobiography of the same name by Reinaldo Arenas and a documentary entitled Havana
 Best (2000) – British film portraying the football career of the Northern Irish soccer star George Best, particularly his years spent at Manchester United
 Bharathi (2000) – Indian Tamil-language biographical film based on the life of Indian writer, poet, journalist, Indian independence activist and social reformer Mahakavi Bharathiyar
 Bread and Roses (2000) – British-Spanish film based on the "Justice for Janitors" campaign of the Service Employees International Union (SEIU)
 Britannic (2000) –  made-for-television spy film depicting a fictional account of the sinking of the ship of the same name off the Greek island of Kea in November 1916
 Burnt Money (Spanish: Plata quemada) (2000) – Argentine action thriller film inspired by the true story of a notorious 1965 bank robbery in Buenos Aires
 Cheaters (2000) – made-for-television drama film chronicling the story of the 1994–1995 Steinmetz High School team that cheated in the United States Academic Decathlon (USAD)
 Chopper (2000) – Australian crime drama film based on the biography of Australian criminal Chopper Read
 The Color of Friendship (2000) – made-for-television film based on actual events about the friendship between two girls; Mahree & Piper, one from the United States and the other from apartheid South Africa, who learn about tolerance and friendship
 The Courage to Love (2000) – made-for-television historical film about Henriette DeLille
 The Crossing (2000) – made-for-television historical drama film about George Washington's crossing of the Delaware River and the Battle of Trenton
 Dark Prince: The True Story of Dracula (2000) – made-for-television war-horror film depicting the story of Vlad Dracula, the historical figure who gave Bram Stoker's Dracula his name
 Daydream Believers: The Monkees' Story (2000) – made-for-television biographical film about the rock and pop band the Monkees
 Dirty Pictures (2000) – made-for-television docudrama based on the 1990 trial of Cincinnati Contemporary Arts Center director Dennis Barrie, who was accused of promoting pornography by presenting an exhibit of photographs by Robert Mapplethorpe that included images of naked children and graphic displays of homosexual sadomasochism
 The Dish (2000) – Australian historical comedy-drama film, the story of the Parkes antenna in New South Wales, Australia, how it plays a key role in the first Apollo Moon landing, and the quirky characters of the nearby town of Parkes
 Divided We Fall (Czech: Musíme si pomáhat) (2000) – Czech comedy-drama film about a childless couple who agree to hide a Jewish friend at great personal risk in Nazi occupied Czechoslovakia
 Dr. Babasaheb Ambedkar (2000) – Indian English-Hindi bilingual drama film telling the story of B. R. Ambedkar, known mainly for his contributions in the emancipation of the downtrodden and oppressed classes in India and shaping the Constitution of India, as the chairman of the Drafting Committee of the Indian Constituent Assembly
 Enslavement: The True Story of Fanny Kemble (2000) – made-for-television biographical drama film based on the life of British actress and abolitionist Fanny Kemble, who sees first-hand the horrors of slavery when she marries an American plantation owner
 Erin Brockovich (2000) – biographical legal drama film based on the true story of Erin Brockovich, who fought against the energy corporation Pacific Gas and Electric Company regarding its culpability for the Hinkley groundwater contamination incident
 Essex Boys (2000) – British crime film loosely based around events in December 1995 that culminated in the Rettendon murders of three drug dealers
 The Farewell (German: Abschied – Brechts letzter Sommer) (2000) – German drama film about Bertolt Brecht
 For Love or Country: The Arturo Sandoval Story (2000) – made-for-television biographical drama film about Cuban jazz musician Aurturo Sandoval
 Freedom Song (2000) – made-for-television biographical drama film based on true stories of the Civil Rights Movement in Mississippi in the 1960s
 Getting Away with Murder: The JonBenét Ramsey Mystery (2000) – made-for-television biographical drama film based on the 1996 murder of JonBenét Ramsey
 Greenfingers (2000) – British comedy film loosely based on the true story about the award-winning prisoners of HMP Leyhill, a minimum-security prison in the Cotswolds, England, a story published in The New York Times in 1998
 Growing Up Brady (2000) – made-for-television biographical drama film based on the 1992 autobiography Growing Up Brady: I Was a Teenage Greg written by actor Barry Williams with Chris Kreski
 Harlan County War (2000) – made-for-television biographical drama film about a Kentucky woman who joins the picket lines for a long, violent strike after her mine-worker husband is nearly killed in a cave-in, and whose father is slowly dying of black lung in the 1970s
 Hendrix (2000) – made-for-television biographical drama film about the life of Jimi Hendrix
 I Dreamed of Africa (2000) – biographical drama film based on the autobiographical novel I Dreamed of Africa by Kuki Gallmann, an Italian writer who moved to Kenya and became involved in conservation work
 In His Life: The John Lennon Story (2000) – made-for-television biographical drama film about John Lennon's teenage years
 In the Light of the Moon (2000) – horror film based on the crimes of Wisconsin murderer Ed Gein
 Innocents (2000) – made-for-television medical drama film based on the Bristol heart scandal of the 1980s and 90s
 The Iron Ladies (Thai: สตรีเหล็ก) (2000) – Thai comedy film based on the true events of a men's volleyball team, composed mainly of gay and kathoey (transgender) athletes
 Isn't She Great (2000) – biographical comedy-drama film that presents a fictionalized biography of author Jacqueline Susann
 Jason and the Argonauts (2000) – made-for-television drama film based on the Greek myth of Jason and the Argonauts 
 Joe Gould's Secret (2000) – drama film based on the magazine article Professor Sea Gull and the book Joe Gould's Secret by Joseph Mitchell
 Joseph: King of Dreams (2000) – direct-to-video animated biblical musical drama film depicting the story of Joseph from the Book of Genesis in the Bible 
 King of the World (2000) – made-for-television biographical drama film depicting the early stages of the career of heavyweight boxer Muhammad Ali
 Le roi danse ( The King is Dancing) (2000) – French costume drama based on Philippe Beaussant's biography of Jean-Baptiste Lully, Lully ou le musicien du soleil (1992)
 The Legend of Rita (German: Die Stille nach dem Schuss) (2000) – German film that focuses on collusion between the East German secret police, or Stasi, and the West German terrorist group Red Army Faction (RAF). The fictional characters all have close parallels to real-life RAF members
 Leak (Dutch: Lek) (2000) – Dutch thriller film based on the book Sans Racune by ex-police officer Jan van Daalen and on a real-life Dutch police scandal from 1994
 The Linda McCartney Story (2000) – made-for-television biographical drama film telling the life story of Linda McCartney 
 Livin' for Love: The Natalie Cole Story (2000) – made-for-television biographical drama film about Natalie Cole
 Lumumba (2000) – biographical centered on Patrice Lumumba in the months before and after Congo-Léopoldville achieved independence from Belgium in June 1960
 Men of Honor (2000) – drama film based on Master Chief Petty Officer Carl Brashear the first African-American Master Diver of the U.S. Navy
 Mermaid (2000) – made-for-television film based on the real-life story of Desiree Leanne Gill as she learns to accept her father's death
 Miracle in Lane 2 (2000) – made-for-television Disney Channel Original Movie about the true story of Justin Yoder, a young boy born with spina bifida and hydrocephalus, who uses a wheelchair and is determined to win a trophy like his athletic older brother
 The Miracle Maker (2000) – British-Russian-American stop motion-animated film about the life of Jesus Christ, through the eyes of Tamar; the terminally ill daughter of Jairus, a priest in Capernaum
 The Miracle Worker (2000) – made-for-television biographical film based on the life of Helen Keller and Anne Sullivan's struggles to teach her
 Murderous Maids (French: Les blessures assassines) (2000) – French film which tells the true story of two French maids Christine and Lea Papin
 My Dog Skip (2000) –  comedy-drama film based on the story of a 9-year-old Willie Morris as he is given a Jack Russell Terrier for his birthday, and how the dog fundamentally changes several aspects of his life
 Noriega: God's Favorite (2000) – made-for-television biographical film telling the story of the rise of general Manuel Antonio Noriega from utter poverty to military dictator of Panama
 One Hundred Steps (Italian: I cento passi) (2000) – Italian crime drama film about the life of Peppino Impastato, a political activist who opposed the mafia in Sicily
 Padre Pio: Between Heaven and Earth (Italian: Padre Pio – Tra cielo e terra) (2000) – Italian made-for-television biographical drama film based on real life events of Roman Catholic friar and later Saint, Padre Pio
 Padre Pio: Miracle Man (Italian: Padre Pio) (2000) – Italian made-for-television biographical drama film based on real life events of Roman Catholic friar and later Saint, Padre Pio
 Pandaemonium (2000) – biographical film based on the early lives of English poets Samuel Taylor Coleridge and William Wordsworth
 Perfect Murder, Perfect Town (2000) – made-for-television biographical drama film covering in great detail what was considered a botched investigation into the murder of six-year-old JonBenét Ramsey
 The Perfect Storm (2000) – biographical disaster drama film based on the story of the Andrea Gail, a commercial fishing vessel that was lost at sea with all hands after being caught in the Perfect Storm of 1991
 Pollock (2000) –  independent biographical romantic drama film that tells the life story of American painter Jackson Pollock
 Possessed (2000) – made-for-television horror film inspired by the exorcism case of Roland Doe
 Quills (2000) – period film inspired by the life and work of the Marquis de Sade
 Range of Motion (2000) – made-for-television drama film based on a book by Elizabeth Berg, about a woman who intensely believes her husband will recover from a coma during the holiday season
 Rated X (2000) – made-for-television film chronicling the story of the Mitchell brothers, Jim and Artie, who were pioneers in the pornography and strip club businesses in San Francisco in the 1970s and 1980s
 Remember the Titans (2000) – biographical sports film based on the 1971 football season of the newly integrated T. C. Williams High School in Alexandria, Virginia
 The Replacements (2000) – sports comedy film loosely based on the 1987 NFL strike
 Ricky 6 (2000) – American-Mexican-Canadian film loosely based on the life of Ricky Kasso, a suburban teenager accused of Satanism and murder in the 1980s
 Seven Songs from the Tundra (Finnish: Seitsemän laulua tundralta) (2000) – Finnish film based on Anastasia Lapsui's own experiences and Nenets folklore
 Shadow of the Vampire (2000) – metafiction horror film telling the story of the making of Nosferatu, eine Symphonie des Grauens
 St. Patrick: The Irish Legend (2000) – made-for-television historical drama film about the life of Saint Patrick who was born in Wales and who brought Christianity to Ireland
 The Stalking of Laurie Show (2000) – made-for-television film based on the true-life murder of Lancaster native Laurie Show 
 Steal This Movie! (2000) – biographical film following Abbie Hoffman's relationship with his second wife Anita and their "awakening" and subsequent conversion to an activist life
 Thirteen Days (2000) – historical political thriller film set during the two-week Cuban Missile Crisis in October 1962, centering on how President John F. Kennedy, Attorney General Robert F. Kennedy, and others handled the explosive situation
 This Is Personal: The Hunt for the Yorkshire Ripper (2000) – British crime drama miniseries, a dramatization of the real-life investigation into the notorious Yorkshire Ripper murders of the late 1970s
 The Three Stooges (2000) – made-for-television biographical film about the slapstick comedy team The Three Stooges
 Too Late (Portuguese: Tarde Demais) (2000) – Portuguese film about a group of Portuguese fishermen who get caught in the middle of a storm in the Tejo river (Lisbon) and struggle to survive
 Two of Us (2000) – made-for-television film which offers a dramatized account of 24 April 1976, six years after the break-up of the Beatles and the day in which Lorne Michaels made a statement on Saturday Night Live offering the Beatles $3,000 to reunite on his program
 Vatel (2000) – French-British historical drama film based on the life of 17th-century French chef François Vatel
 When Andrew Came Home (2000) – made-for-television film about a woman who is reunited with her kidnapped son after five years
 When the Sky Falls (2000) – film à clef inspired by the assassination of drug-related crime reporter Veronica Guerin
 Who Killed Atlanta's Children? (2000) – German-American made-for-television film about the Atlanta murders of 1979-1981
 Word and Utopia (2000) – Portuguese biographical film depicting the life of António Vieira

2001 
 61* (2001) – made-for-television sports drama film inspired by Roger Maris and Mickey Mantle on their quest to break Babe Ruth's 1927 single-season home run record of 60 during the 1961 season of the New York Yankees
 A Beautiful Mind (2001) – biographical drama film based on the life of the American mathematician John Nash, a Nobel Laureate in Economics and Abel Prize winner
 A Huey P. Newton Story (2001) – solo performance film depicting activist Huey P. Newton's life and time as a person, a citizen and an activist
 The Affair of the Necklace (2001) – historical drama film based on what became known as the Affair of the Diamond Necklace, an incident that helped fuel the French populace's disillusionment with the monarchy and, among other causes, eventually led to the French Revolution
 Ali (2001) – biographical sports drama film focuses on ten years in the life of the boxer Muhammad Ali from 1964 to 1974, featuring his capture of the heavyweight title from Sonny Liston, his conversion to Islam, criticism of the Vietnam War, and banishment from boxing
 Almost a Woman (2001) – made-for-television film about Esmeralda Santiago and her family who move to New York from a rural area of Puerto Rico and the challenges she and her family face
 An American Rhapsody (2001) – Hungarian-American biographical drama film based on the true story of the director, Éva Gárdos' American-Hungarian family
 Anatomy of a Hate Crime (2001) – made-for-television biographical film based on the 1998 murder of Matthew Shepard
 Anne Frank: The Whole Story (2001) – made-for-television film based on the 1998 book Anne Frank: The Biography by Melissa Müller
 Another Life (2001) – British crime film about couple Edith Thompson and Frederick Bywaters, who were executed for the murder of Thompson's husband Percy in 1920s London
 Anybody's Nightmare (2001) – British made-for-television crime drama film based on the true story of the imprisonment of Sheila Bowler, who was accused of murdering her aunt
 Aśoka (2001) – Indian Hindi-language epic historical drama film about the early life of emperor Asoka, of the Maurya dynasty, who ruled most of the Indian subcontinent in the 3rd century BCE
 Attila (2001) – miniseries set during the waning days of the Western Roman Empire and follows Attila the Hun (reigned 434–453) during his rise to power
 Behind Enemy Lines (2001) – war film loosely based on the Mrkonjić Grad incident that occurred during the Bosnian War
 The Believer (2001) – drama film loosely based on the true story of Daniel Burros, a member of the American Nazi Party, and the New York branch of the United Klans of America, who committed suicide after being revealed as Jewish by a New York Times reporter
 The Big Heist (2001) – Canadian-American made-for-television crime drama film based on the 1978 Lufthansa heist
 Black Hawk Down (2001) – war film about the U.S. military's 1993 raid in Mogadishu
 Blonde (2001) – made-for-television biographical film depicting the life of Marilyn Monroe
 Blow (2001) –  biographical crime film about American cocaine smuggler George Jung
 Bojangles (2001) – made-for-television biographical drama film that chronicles the life of entertainer Bill "Bojangles" Robinson
 Boss of Bosses (2001) – made-for-television biographical film depicting the life of former Gambino crime family boss Paul Castellano
 Boycott (2001) – made-for-television biographical drama film based on the story of the 1955–1956 Montgomery bus boycott
 Brian's Song (2001) – made-for-television drama film, telling the story of Brian Piccolo, a white running back who meets, clashes with and befriends fellow Chicago Bears running back Gale Sayers
 Bride of the Wind (2001) – period drama film loosely based on the life of Alma Mahler, Bride of the Wind recounts Alma's marriage to the composer Gustav Mahler and her romantic liaisons
 Bully (2001) – crime drama film based on the murder of Bobby Kent, by seven teens in what is now Weston, Florida
 Bus 44 (Mandarin: 車四十四) (2001) – Chinese short film based on the true story of a bus driver and her passengers' encounter with highway robbers
 The Cat's Meow (2001) – historical drama film inspired by the mysterious death of film mogul Thomas H. Ince that occurred on William Randolph Hearst's yacht during a weekend cruise celebrating Ince's birthday in November 1924
 Conspiracy (2001) – German made-for-television war film that dramatizes the 1942 Wannsee Conference
 Das Experiment ( The Experiment) (2001) – German thriller film based on Mario Giordano's novel Black Box and deals with a social experiment which resembles Philip Zimbardo's Stanford prison experiment of 1971
 The Day Reagan Was Shot (2001) – made-for-television biographical drama film loosely based on events surrounding the Reagan assassination attempt on 30 March 1981, by John Hinckley, Jr.
 The Days of Sadat (2001) – Eygptian biographical film about former President of Egypt Anwar Al Sadat
 Dhyaas Parva (2001) – Indian Marathi-language drama biographical film about social reformer Raghunath Dhondo Karve
 The Diaries of Vaslav Nijinsky (2001) – Australian biographical film about Vaslav Nijinsky, based on the premier danseur's published diaries 
 Die Manns – Ein Jahrhundertroman (2001) – German docudrama-miniseries telling the story of the Mann family, a family of famous writers
 Enemy at the Gates (2001) – war film based on Vasily Zaytsev during the Battle of Stalingrad
 From Hell (2001) – period horror thriller film based on the murders of Jack the Ripper
 Goebbels und Geduldig (2001) – German made-for-television war comedy film about Joseph Goebbels and Nazi Germany
 The Grey Zone (2001) – war film and Holocaust crime drama film about the story of a Jewish Sonderkommando XII in the Auschwitz death camp in October 1944
 Herman U.S.A. (2001) – romantic comedy film about seventy-eight bachelor farmers who advertise for companionship, leading to a response far outstripping expectations in a small Minnesota town
 Hot Money (2001) – British made-for-television crime drama film inspired by the Loughton incinerator thefts that occurred between 1988 and 1992 at the Bank of England's incinerator plant in Loughton, Essex
 In Love and War (2001) – made-for-television film based on the 1971 World War II memoir Love and War in the Apennines by Eric Newby
 In the Time of the Butterflies (2001) – made-for-television film depicting a fictionalized account of the lives of the Mirabal sisters, Dominican revolutionary activists, who opposed the dictatorship of Rafael Trujillo and were assassinated on 25 November 1960
 Inside the Osmonds (2001) – made-for-television drama film about the personal lives and professional careers of The Osmonds
 Invincible (2001) – drama film depicting the story of a Jewish strongman in Germany, based on the real-life figure Zishe Breitbart
 Iris (2001) – biographical drama film about Irish novelist Iris Murdoch and her mental decline from Alzheimer's disease
 Jackie, Ethel, Joan: The Women of Camelot – drama miniseries based on the 2000 book Jackie, Ethel, Joan: Women of Camelot by J. Randy Taraborrelli about Jackie, Ethel and Joan Kennedy
 James Dean (2001) – made-for-television biographical drama film based on the life and career of Hollywood actor James Dean, as well as his relationship with his estranged father
 Jewel (2001) – made-for-television drama film based on the book of the same name by Bret Lott, about a 40-year-old woman who gives birth to a girl with down syndrome in the 1940s
 Just Ask My Children (2001) – made-for-television drama film recounting the true story of the Kern County child abuse cases from the perspectives of various members of the Kniffen Family
 Kandahar  (Dari: قندهار) (2001) – Iranian film about Afghan refugee Nelofer Pazira's return to Afghanistan
 Let's Get Skase (2001) – Australian comedy film based on the life of failed Australian businessman Christopher Skase, who after the collapse of his Qintex business, fled to Majorca, Spain
 Life with Judy Garland: Me and My Shadows (2001) – made-for-television drama film based on the 1998 book Me and My Shadows: A Family Memoir written by Lorna Luft, the daughter of legendary singer-actress Judy Garland
 The Lost Battalion (2001) – made-for-television war drama film about the Lost Battalion of World War I, which was cut off and surrounded by German forces in the Argonne Forest during the Meuse-Argonne Offensive of 1918
 Mad Love (Spanish: Juana la Loca) (2001)  – Spanish period drama film about the tragic fate of Queen Joanna of Castile, madly in love with an unfaithful husband, Philip the Handsome, Archduke of Austria
 The Miracle of the Cards (2001) – Canadian-American made-for-television drama film based on the true story of English youngster Craig Shergold, who in 1988 is diagnosed with a brain tumor
 Mockingbird Don't Sing (2001) – independent film based on the true story of Genie, a modern-day feral child
 The Moonhunter (Thai: 14 ตุลา สงครามประชาชน) (2001) – Thai film based on the autobiography of Seksan Prasertkul
 The Moving True Story of a Woman Ahead of Her Time (West Frisian: Nynke) (2001) – Dutch West Frisian language drama film about the life of Nienke van Hichtum and Dutch socialist and politician Pieter Jelles Troelstra
 My Sassy Girl (Korean: 엽기적인 그녀) (2001) – South Korean romantic comedy film based on a true story told in a series of blog posts written by Kim Ho-sik, who later adapted them into a fictional novel
 Nowhere in Africa (German: Nirgendwo in Afrika) (2001) – German drama film film based on the 1995 autobiographical novel of the same name by Stefanie Zweig, telling the story of the life in Kenya of a German-Jewish family that emigrated there in 1938 to escape persecution in Nazi Germany
 One Night the Moon (2001) – Australian musical film based on the true story of a young girl who went missing in the Australian outback in 1932
 The Other Side of Heaven (2001) – adventure drama film based on John H. Groberg's autobiography In the Eye of the Storm
 Pearl Harbor (2001) –  romantic war drama film based on the events of the Pearl Harbor attack and the Doolittle Raid
 Piñero (2001) – biographical film about the troubled life of Nuyorican poet and playwright Miguel Piñero
 The Princess and the Marine (2001) – made-for-television romantic drama film based on the true story of American Marine Jason Johnson and Bahraini Princess Meriam Al-Khalifa
 Prozac Nation (2001) – American-German drama film based on the 1994 autobiography of the same name by Elizabeth Wurtzel, which describes Wurtzel's experiences with atypical depression
 Quitting (Mandarin: 昨天) (2001) – Chinese drama based on the life of actor Jia Hongsheng, who suffered from heroin and marijuana addiction from 1992 to 1997
 Race to Space (2001) – Family drama film about the 1960s space race between the United States and the Soviet Union
 Riding in Cars with Boys (2001) – biographical film based on the life of memoirist, children's author and creative writing teacher Beverly Donofrio, who wrote the autobiographical book on her life by the same title
 Rock Star (2001) –  musical comedy-drama film telling the story of Chris "Izzy" Cole, a tribute band singer whose ascendance to the position of lead vocalist of his favorite band was inspired by the real-life story of Tim "Ripper" Owens
 Surviving Gilligan's Island (2001) – made-for-television docudrama based on the making of 1964–1967 television sitcom Gilligan's Island
 Sword of Honour (2001) – made-for-television film loosely based upon Evelyn Waugh's own experiences in the Second World War
 Taurus (Russian: Телец) (2001) – Russian biographical drama film about former politician Vladimir Lenin
 There is a Secret in my Soup (Cantonese: 人頭豆腐湯) (2001) – Hong Kong horror film based on the Hello Kitty murder
 Time Out (French: L'Emploi du temps) (2001) – French drama film loosely based on the life story of spree killer and impostor Jean-Claude Romand
 The Tunnel (German: Der Tunnel) (2001) – German made-for-television drama film loosely based on true events in Berlin following the closing of the East German border in August 1961 and the subsequent construction of the Berlin Wall
 Uprising (2001) – war drama miniseries about the Warsaw Ghetto uprising during the Holocaust
 Varian's War (2001) – made-for-television drama film based on the life and wartime exploits of Varian Fry who saved more than 2,000 Jewish artists from Vichy France, the conquered ally of Nazi Germany
 Vera Brühne (2001) – German made-for-television drama film about Vera Brühne who was convicted of murder
 What Makes a Family (2001) – made-for-television film involving a lesbian couple living in Florida who choose to have a child
 When Billie Beat Bobby (2001) – made-for-television sports comedy-drama film detailing the historic 1973 "The Battle of the Sexes" tennis match between Billie Jean King and Bobby Riggs and what led up to it
 Witness of Truth: The Railway Murders (2001) – made-for-television docudrama that dramatizes the crimes committed by John Duffy and David Mulcahy
 Zubeidaa (2001) – Indian film based on the life of the ill-fated actress Zubeida Begum

2002 
 23rd March 1931: Shaheed (2002) – Indian Hindi-language historical biographical film which depicts the events leading up to the hanging of Indian freedom fighter Bhagat Singh and his companions Rajguru and Sukhdev on 23 March 1931
 24 Hour Party People (2002) – British comedy-drama biographical film about Manchester's popular music community from 1976 to 1992, and specifically about Factory Records
 10,000 Black Men Named George (2002) – made-for-television drama film about union activist A. Philip Randolph's efforts to organize the black porters of the Pullman Rail Company in 1920s America, known as the Brotherhood of Sleeping Car Porters
 A Is for Acid (2002) – British made-for-television film based on the life of the serial killer John George Haigh, known as the Acid Bath Murderer, because he dissolved the bodies of six people in sulphuric acid
 Adaptation (2002) – based both on Susan Orlean's non-fiction book The Orchid Thief, as well as screenwriter Charlie Kaufman's struggle to adapt the book into a film
 The Adversary (French: L'Adversaire) (2002) – French drama film based on the 2000 book of the same name by Emmanuel Carrère which is inspired by the real-life story of French spree killer and impostor Jean-Claude Romand
 AKA (2002) – British drama film, set in the late 1970s in Britain and deals with the story of Dean, an 18-year-old boy who assumes another identity to enter high society, largely an autobiographical account of director and writer Duncan Roy's early life
 Amen. (2002) – historical drama film examining the political and diplomatic relationship between the Vatican and Nazi Germany during World War II
 Anita & Me (2002) – British comedy-drama film, based on the semi-autobiographical, book of the same name by Meera Syal, about Syal's childhood in the mining village of Essington, Staffordshire
 Antwone Fisher (2002) – biographical drama film inspired by the true story of writer Antwone Fisher, based on his autobiographical book Finding Fish
 Auto Focus (2002) – based on the life and career of Hogan's Heroes star Bob Crane, as well as his friendship with John Henry Carpenter
 Balzac and the Little Chinese Seamstress (Mandarin: Xiao cai feng) (2002) – French/Chinese romance drama film based on the semi-autobiographical novel of the same title by Dai Sijie, revolving around two young Chinese boys of bourgeois background who were sent to a remote village in Sichuan for three years of re-education during the Cultural Revolution
 Bertie and Elizabeth (2002) – made-for-television film about the relationship between King George VI and his wife Queen Elizabeth from their first meeting to the King's death in the winter of 1952
 Better Luck Tomorrow (2002) – crime drama film loosely based on the murder of Stuart Tay, a teenager from Orange County, California by four Sunny Hills High School honor students on 31 December 1992
 Black and White (2002) – Australian biographical drama film based on the story of Max Stuart, a young aboriginal man who was sentenced to death after being found guilty of the murder of a nine-year-old girl on what was considered questionable evidence
 Bloody Sunday (2002) – British-Irish film based on the events of Bloody Sunday on 30 January 1972, in Derry, Northern Ireland, in which 26 unarmed civil-rights protesters and bystanders were shot by soldiers of the British Army
 Callas Forever (2002) – biographical partially fictionalised account of the making of a movie of Georges Bizet's Carmen, focusing on Maria Callas whose now-ragged voice is well past its prime
 Catch Me If You Can (2002) – biographical crime film telling the story of con artist Frank Abagnale
 Champion (South Korean: 챔피언) (2002) – South Korean biographical drama film about South Korean boxer Duk Koo Kim
 Chicago (2002) –  musical black comedy crime film adapted from the stage musical by Bob Fosse and Fred Ebb, exploring the themes of celebrity, scandal, and corruption in Jazz Age Chicago
 Chopin: Desire for Love (Polish: Chopin. Pragnienie miłości) (2002) – Polish biographical film based on the life story of the Polish pianist and composer Frédéric Chopin and his affair with feminist writer George Sand
 City by the Sea (2002) – crime drama film based on the story of former police detective Vincent LaMarca
 City of God (Portuguese: Cidade de Deus) (2002) – Brazilian crime drama film, adapted from a book by Paulo Lins, depicting the growth of organized crime in Rio de Janeiro between the end of the 1960s and the beginning of the 1980s
 Confessions of a Dangerous Mind (2002) – biographical spy comedy film depicting the life of popular game show host and producer Chuck Barris, who claimed to have also been an assassin for the Central Intelligence Agency (CIA)
 Conviction (2002) – made-for-television biographical film about Carl Upchurch, a hardcore felon who managed to educate himself and developed a spiritual awakening during one of his numerous stints inside prison
 Copenhagen (2002) – made-for-television drama film based on an event that occurred in Copenhagen in 1941, a meeting between the physicists Niels Bohr and Werner Heisenberg
 Crossed Over (2002) – Canadian made-for-television film based on Beverly Lowry's memoir Crossed Over: A Murder, A Memoir
 Dahmer (2002) – the story of serial killer Jeffrey Dahmer
 Door to Door (2002) – made-for-television drama film about Bill Porter, an inspiring and successful door-to-door salesman with cerebral palsy
 Double Teamed (2002) – made-for-television Disney Channel Original Movie based on the life stories of professional identical twin basketball players Heather and Heidi Burge
 The Enclave (2002) – made-for-television film about the fall of Srebrenica and the Dutch government's failure to protect the town from attackers
 Evelyn (2002) – Irish drama film loosely based on the true story of Desmond Doyle and his fight in the Irish courts (December 1955) to be reunited with his children
 Expedition: Bismarck (2002) – made-for-television film following an underwater expedition to the German Battleship Bismarck and digitally reconstructing events that led up to the ship's sinking during World War II
 Facing the Truth (Danish: At kende sandheden) (2002) – Danish film shot in black-and-white documentary style, and based on the real life of director Nils Malmros' father, the film relates the hardships of a young neurosurgeon struggling through a medical lawsuit
 The Falklands Play (2002) – made-for-television film detailing a dramatic account of the political events leading up to, and including, the 1982 Falklands War
 Fidel (2002) – biographical miniseries about the Cuban revolution and political career of Fidel Castro
 Frida (2002) – drama film the story of Mexican painter Frida Kahlo
 Führer Ex (2002) – German neo-nazi drama film that deals with the German neo-Nazi scene at the time of the political change in the GDR and after reunification, based on the autobiographical book Die Abrechnung by Ingo Hasselbach
 Gada Meilin (2002) – Chinese film about the story of Inner Mongolian hero Gada Meiren, who led a failed rebellion at the beginning of the 1930s against dispossession of Mongol banner lands by Zhang Zuolin and Zhang Xueliang
 The Gathering Storm (2002) – British made-for-television biographical film about Winston Churchill in the years just prior to World War II
 Gerry (2002) – drama film, it is the first film of Gus Van Sant's "Death Trilogy", three films based on deaths that occurred in real life, and is succeeded by Elephant (2003) and Last Days (2005)
 Gleason (2002) – made-for-television biographical film about Jackie Gleason
 Gotta Kick It Up! (2002) – made-for-television Disney Channel Original Movie based on a true story of a middle school dance team
 Harold Shipman: Doctor Death (2002) – British television drama about the life and crimes of serial killer Harold Shipman
 Hell on Heels: The Battle of Mary Kay (2002) – made-for-television biographical comedy-drama film about Mary Kay Ash
 The Hours (2002) – psychological drama film featuring the story of Virginia Woolf in 1920s England, who is struggling with depression and mental illness while trying to write her novel Mrs Dalloway
 House of Fools (Russian: Dom durakov) (2002) – Russian film, partially inspired by the real-life tragedy of the psychiatric hospital in Shali, Chechnya, which was abandoned by the personnel during the Russian bombing campaign and in which many patients subsequently died from attacks and neglect
 Jeffrey Archer: The Truth (2002) – made-for-television satirical comedy drama film based on the life of Jeffrey Archer
 Joe and Max (2002) – American-German boxing film based on the true story of the two boxing matches between American Joe Louis and German Max Schmeling
 John XXIII: The Pope of Peace (Italian:  Papa Giovanni – Ioannes XXIII) (2002) – Italian made-for-television film based on real life events of Roman Catholic Pope John XXIII
 The Junction Boys (2002) – made-for-television sports drama film about the Junction Boys and based on Jim Dent's 2001 book The Junction Boys
 K-19: The Widowmaker (2002) – historical submarine film that takes place in 1961 and focuses its story on the Soviet K-19 submarine
 Lapu-Lapu (2002) – Filipino historical film based on datu Lapulapu, the first Filipino native to resist imperial Spanish colonization
 The Laramie Project (2002) – adapted from the play The Laramie Project, both by Moisés Kaufman, telling the story of the aftermath of the 1998 murder of American student Matthew Shepard in Laramie, Wyoming
 Last Call (2002) – drama film about F. Scott Fitzgerald, based on Against the Current: As I Remember F. Scott Fitzgerald, the 1985 memoir by Frances Kroll Ring
 The Legend of Bhagat Singh (2002) – Indian Hindi-language biographical period film about Bhagat Singh, a socialist revolutionary who fought for Indian independence along with fellow members of the Hindustan Republic Association
 Lilya 4-ever (2002) – Russian-language Swedish-Danish Tragedy film depicting the downward spiral of Lilya Michailova, a girl in the former Soviet Union whose mother abandons her to move to the United States, the story is loosely based on the true case of Danguolė Rasalaitė
 Live from Baghdad (2002) – made-for-television film that focuses on the news media's (primarily CNN's) coverage of the Iraq War, based on Robert Wiener's book of the same title
 Madame Satã (2002) – Brazilian–French biographical drama film telling the story of Madame Satã 
 The Magdalene Sisters (2002) – British/Irish drama film about three teenage girls who were sent to Magdalene asylums (also known as 'Magdalene Laundries') homes for women who were labelled as "fallen" by their families or society
 The Man Who Saved Christmas (2002) – biographical film based on the true story about the efforts of toymaker Alfred Carlton Gilbert of the A. C. Gilbert Company to continue making toys during World War I
 Martin and Lewis (2002) – made-for-television biographical film exploring the lives of the comedy team of Martin and Lewis
 Master Spy: The Robert Hanssen Story (2002) – Canadian-American made-for-television film based on the story of Robert Hanssen, who was charged with and convicted of selling American secrets to the Soviet Union
 The Matthew Shepard Story (2002) – Canadian-American made-for-television film based on the true story of Matthew Shepard, a 21-year-old gay youth who was murdered in 1998
 Monday Night Mayhem (2002) – made-for-television film about the origin of ABC's television series Monday Night Football
 The Mothman Prophecies (2002) – adapted from the 1975 book of the same name by John Keel, telling the story of the Mothman sightings in the Point Pleasant, West Virginia, area in 1966 and 1967
 Murder in Greenwich (2002) – made-for-television film based on the 1998 book of the same title by Mark Fuhrman, about the Murder of Martha Moxley
 Nightstalker (2002) – crime horror film about American serial killer, serial rapist, and burglar Richard Ramirez
 Our America (2002) – drama film based on the book Our America: Life And Death on the South Side of Chicago, about two African-American teen radio reporters and their documentary investigation of a notorious child murder
 Paid in Full (2002) – based on events in the life of drug dealer Azie Faison during the crack epidemic in 1980s Harlem, leading up to the murders of his friends Rich and Donnell Porter
 Path to War (2002) – made-for-television biographical film telling the story of the Vietnam War as seen through the eyes of United States President Lyndon B. Johnson and his cabinet members
 The Pennsylvania Miners' Story (2002) – television film based on the real events occurred at the Quecreek Mine
 Perlasca – Un eroe Italiano (2002) – Italian drama film about Giorgio Perlasca, an Italian businessman working in Hungary for his government who began to help Jews find shelter in Spanish safe houses during World War II
 The Pianist (2002) – biographical drama war film based on the memoir by Władysław Szpilman, a Polish musician of Jewish origins and a childhood survivor of Nazi-occupied Poland
 Point of Origin (2002) – biographical crime film based on the true story of convicted serial arsonist John Leonard Orr
 Rabbit-Proof Fence (2002) – Australian drama film based on the book Follow The Rabbit Proof Fence by Doris Pilkington Garimara, based on the true story of the author's mother and two other mixed-race Aboriginal girls who ran away from the Moore River Native Settlement in Western Australia, to return to their Aboriginal families after having been placed there in 1931
 RFK (2002) – made-for-television film which takes place through the eyes of Robert F. Kennedy after his brother John F. Kennedy's assassination in 1963
 The Rookie (2002) – based on the life of American professional baseball player Jim Morris, known for his brief Major League Baseball career
 The Rosa Parks Story (2002) – made-for-television biographical film about Rosa Parks
 Salem Witch Trials (2002) – American-Canadian made-for-television historical drama film, a dramatization of the Salem witch trials
 Savage Messiah (2002) – Canadian thriller-drama film about the real-life story of Roch "Moïse" Thériault, a cult leader who was arrested in Burnt River, Ontario, in 1989
 Shackleton (2002) – British television film telling the true story of explorer Sir Ernest Shackleton's 1914 Antarctic expedition on the ship Endurance
 Sightings: Heartland Ghost (2002) – television film based on the TV series Sightings and inspired by true events
 Silent Night (2002) – Canadian fact-based television film set on Christmas Eve in 1944, during the Battle of the Bulge of World War II
 Sins of the Father (2002) – made-for-TV drama film based on a Texas Monthly article by Pamela Colloff chronicling the 1963 16th Street Baptist Church bombing in Birmingham, Alabama in which four young African American girls were killed while attending Sunday-school
 The Soul Keeper (2002) – Italian-French-British romance drama film loosely based on real life events of Russian psychoanalyst and physician Sabina Spielrein and notably on her therapeutic and sentimental relationship with fellow psychoanalyst Carl Gustav Jung
 St. Francis (Italian: Francesco) (2002) – Italian made-for-television biographical film based on real life events of Roman Catholic Friar and then Saint Francis of Assisi
 Tagged: The Jonathan Wamback Story (2002) – Canadian television film that follows the story of teenager Jonathan Wamback and his struggle with teen violence. The film is based on a true incident
 Ted Bundy (2002) – crime film about serial killer Ted Bundy
 Torso: The Evelyn Dick Story (2002) – Canadian made-for-television crime thriller film based on the 1946/1947 murder trial of Evelyn Dick that remains the most lurid murder case in Canadian history
 Two Men Went to War (2002) – British war comedy-drama film based on a true World War II story, from Raymond Foxall's book Amateur Commandos which describes the adventures of two army dental corps soldiers who sneak off on their own personal invasion of France
 Vampire Clan (2002) – drama/horror film based on the horrific true story of the 1996 "Vampire Killings" in Florida carried out by Roderick 'Rod' Justin Farrell
 Video Voyeur: The Susan Wilson Story (2002) – television drama based on the real-life story of Susan Wilson, a Louisiana woman, who was videotaped in her own home by a neighbor
 Warning: Parental Advisory (2002) – made-for-television drama film based on the formation of the Parents Music Resource Center and its impact on music during 1985
 We Were Soldiers (2002) – based on the Battle of Ia Drang, the first major engagement of American troops in the Vietnam War
 Whitewash: The Clarence Brandley Story (2002) – biographical film telling the true story of Clarence Brandley who was wrongly convicted for the rape and murder of Cheryl Dee Fergeson in 1981
 Windtalkers (2002) – war film based on the real story of Navajo code talkers during World War II
 Yossi & Jagger (2002) – Israeli romantic drama film about soldiers at the Israel–Lebanon border who try to find some peace and solace from the daily routine of war

2003 
 44 Minutes: The North Hollywood Shoot-Out (2003) – made-for-television crime film based on the real-life story of the 1997 robbery known as the North Hollywood shootout
 A Date with Darkness: The Trial and Capture of Andrew Luster (2003) – made-for-television drama film based on a true story about criminal Andrew Luster
 Aithe (2003) – Indian Telugu-language thriller film dealing with underworld criminal nexus and hijacking 
 Alltag (2003) – Turkish-German drama film depicting life in the neighborhood of Kreuzberg
 America's Prince: The John F. Kennedy Jr. Story (2003) – made-for-television biographical film about the life of John F. Kennedy Jr., based on Christopher Andersen's 2000 bestseller, The Day John Died
 American Splendor (2003) – biographical comedy-drama film about Harvey Pekar, the author of the American Splendor comic book series
 And Starring Pancho Villa as Himself (2003) – made-for-television western film based on the story of Pancho Villa in the Mexican Revolution and his bid to raise funds by making a film of his real battles
 Baadasssss! (2003) – biographical drama film based on the struggles of Van Peebles' father Melvin Van Peebles as he attempts to film and distribute Sweet Sweetback's Baadasssss Song, a film that was widely credited with showing Hollywood that a viable African-American audience existed, and thus influencing the creation of the Blaxploitation genre
 Behind the Camera: The Unauthorized Story of Three's Company (2003) – made-for-television comedy-drama film documenting the success of the sitcom Three's Company, as well as the interpersonal conflicts that occurred among its staff and cast
 Benedict Arnold: A Question of Honor (2003) – made-for-television drama film portraying the career of Benedict Arnold in the American Revolutionary War and his dramatic switch in 1780 from fighting for American Independence to being a Loyalist trying to preserve British rule in America
 Blind Flight (2003) – British biographical drama film based on the true-life story of the kidnapping and imprisonment of the Irish academic Brian Keenan and the English journalist John McCarthy, two of the hostages in the Lebanon hostage crisis
 Boudica (2003) – British biographical-historical made-for-television film about the queen of the Iceni tribe, Boudica
 The Brides in the Bath (2003) – British made-for-television film based on the life and Old Bailey trial of British serial killer and bigamist George Joseph Smith
 Calendar Girls (2003) – British comedy film based on a true story of a group of middle-aged Yorkshire women who produced a nude calendar to raise money for Leukaemia Research under the auspices of the Women's Institutes in April 1999 after the cancer death of the husband of one of their members
 Cambridge Spies (2003) – British miniseries concerning the lives of the best-known quartet of the Cambridge Five Soviet spies, from 1934 to the 1951 defection of Guy Burgess and Donald Maclean to the Soviet Union
 Catharisis (Japanese: カタルシス) (2003) – Japanese made-for-television film about a 14-year-old boy murders a young girl in the suburbs of Tokyo, based on a true story 
 Conspiracy of Silence (2003) – British drama film set in Ireland and inspired by real events, the film challenges celibacy and its implication for the Catholic Church in the 21st century
 The Crooked E: The Unshredded Truth About Enron (2003) – made-for-television film based on the book Anatomy of Greed by Brian Cruver, about the rise and fall of the Houston-based Enron Corporation
 Danielle Cable: Eyewitness (2003) – British made-for-television true crime drama film, based upon the murder of Stephen Cameron by Kenneth Noye in a road rage incident in 1996
 Danny Deckchair (2003) – Australian comedy film inspired by the story of the Lawnchair Larry flight
 DC 9/11: Time of Crisis (2003) – made-for-television film about the September 11 attacks as seen from the point of view of President George W. Bush and his staff
 D.C. Sniper: 23 Days of Fear (2003) – made-for-television film based on the Beltway sniper attacks of 2002
 Deacons for Defense (2003) – made-for-television drama film loosely based on the activities of the Deacons for Defense and Justice in 1965 in Bogalusa, Louisiana
 The Deal (2003) – British made-for-television film depicting the Blair-Brown deal—a well-documented pact that Tony Blair and Gordon Brown made whereby Brown would not stand in the 1994 Labour leadership election, so that Blair could have a clear run at becoming leader of the party and later as Prime Minister instead
 Eila (2003) – Finnish drama film about a cleaning woman who decides to sue the state for illegal discharge
 Elephant (2003) – psychological drama film based on the events surrounding the 20 April 1999, Columbine High School massacre in Columbine, Colorado
 The Elizabeth Smart Story (2003) – made-for-television crime drama film about the high-profile Elizabeth Smart kidnapping case
 Escape from Taliban (2003) – Indian film based on the story A Kabuliwala's Bengali Wife by Sushmita Banerjee, who fled Afghanistan in 1995 after six years of living there with her Afghan husband
 Evil (Swedish: Ondskan) (2003) – Swedish drama film set in a private boarding school in the late-1950s with institutional violence as its theme
 Ferrari (2003) – Italian made-for-television biographical film telling the story of Enzo Ferrari's rise from a successful race driver to one of the most famous entrepreneurs of all time
 Frankie and Johnny Are Married (2003) – comedy film chronicling the troubles a producer has trying to mount a production of the Terrence McNally play Frankie and Johnny in the Clair de Lune
 Full-Court Miracle (2003) – made-for-television film inspired by the true story of University of Virginia Cavaliers basketball star Lamont Carr
 Gacy (2003) – crime horror film based on serial killer John Wayne Gacy; focuses on Gacy's life after he moved to Norwood Park in 1971 up until his arrest in 1978
 Godforsaken (2003) – Dutch drama film based on the real life of the "Gang from Venlo", that left a trail of death and destruction in the North-Middle Limburg area from 1993 till 1994
 Gods and Generals (2003) – prequel to Gettysburg, about General Stonewall Jackson
 Going For Broke (2003) – made-for-television drama film based on the true story of former Juvenile Diabetes Foundation charity director Gina Garcia, who from 1993 to 1997 fraudulently issued cheques from the charity to herself to fund her gambling addiction
 The Good Pope: Pope John XXIII (Italian: Il Papa Buono) (2003) – Italian made-for-television drama film based on real life events of Pope John XXIII 
 Grand Theft Parsons (2003) – American-British comedy-drama film based on the true story of country rock musician Gram Parsons, who died of an overdose in 1973
 Haggard: The Movie (2003) – independent comedy film based on the story of how reality television personality Ryan Dunn's girlfriend may have cheated on him
 Hear the Silence (2003) – semi-fictional made-for-television drama film based around the discredited idea of a potential link between the MMR vaccine and autism
 Henry VIII (2003)  – British miniseries chronicling the life of Henry VIII of England from the disintegration of his first marriage to an aging Spanish princess until his death following a stroke in 1547, by which time he had married for the sixth time
 High Roller: The Stu Ungar Story (2003) – biographical film focusing on the life of American professional poker and gin player Stu Ungar
 Hitler: The Rise of Evil (2003) – Canadian television miniseries in two parts, exploring Adolf Hitler's rise to power during the years after the First World War
 Homeless to Harvard: The Liz Murray Story (2003) – made-for-television biographical film about Liz Murray
 I Accuse (2003) – Canadian drama film based on the case of John Schneeberger, a Canadian doctor convicted of using drugs to rape two patients
 Ice Bound (2003) – made-for-television film about Jerri Nielsen, a cancer-stricken physician stranded at a South Pole research station who, under dangerous circumstances, and with the help of co-workers, treats her own illness
 Imperium: Augustus (2003) – British-Italian historical film telling of the life story of Octavian and how he became Augustus
 In Search of Janáček (Czech: Hledání Janáčka) (2003) – Czech made-for-television film about life of composer Leoš Janáček
 Jasper, Texas (2003) – made-for-television drama film based on a true story and focuses on the aftermath of a crime in which three white men from the small town of Jasper, Texas, killed African American James Byrd Jr. by dragging him behind their pickup truck
 The Lion in Winter (2003) – made-for-television biographical historical film depicting the story of King Henry II of England and his need to choose a new heir to the throne following the death of his Eldest son, Henry
 LOC Kargil (2003) – Indian war film based on the 1999 Kargil War
 Looking for Victoria (2003) – British made-for-television biographical drama film based on the life of Queen Victoria
 The Lost Prince (2003) – British miniseries about the life of Prince John – youngest child of Britain's King George V and Queen Mary – who died at the age of 13 in 1919
 Lucy (2003) – made-for-television film based on the life and career of actress and comedian Lucille Ball
 Luther (2003) – historical drama film dramatizing the life of Protestant Christian reformer Martin Luther
 Maria Goretti (2003) – Italian made-for-television film based on real life events of Catholic virgin-martyr and Saint Maria Goretti
 Martha, Inc.: The Story of Martha Stewart (2003) – made-for-television film in which the life of Martha Stewart is outlined starting from her life in New Jersey to the scandal behind her arrest
 Memories of Murder (Korean: Salinui chueok) (2003) – South Korean crime drama film loosely based on the true story of Korea's first serial murders in history, which took place between 1986 and 1991 in Hwaseong, Gyeonggi Province
 The Middle of the World (2003) – Brazilian film based on the true story of Cícero Ferreira Dias, a former truck driver who took his family from Paráiba to Rio de Janeiro in search of a "R$1,000 job"
 The Miracle of Bern (German: Das Wunder von Bern) (2003) – German film which tells the story of a German family (particularly of a young boy and his depressed ex-POW father) and the unexpected West German miracle victory in the 1954 World Cup Final in Bern, Switzerland
 Monster (2003) – the story of serial killer Aileen Wuornos
 Mother Teresa of Calcutta (2003) – biographical television film based on the life of Mother Teresa, the founder of the Missionaries of Charity religious institute 
 Ned Kelly (2003) – dramatization of the life of Ned Kelly, a legendary bushranger and outlaw who was active mostly in Victoria, the colony of his birth
 The Night We Called It a Day (2003) – Australian-American comedy drama film based on the true events surrounding Frank Sinatra's 1974 tour in Australia 
 Open Water (2003) – drama film based on the story of Tom and Eileen Lonergan, who were left behind on their scuba diving trip in the South Pacific
 The Other Boleyn Girl (2003) – made-for-television film based on the story of Mary Boleyn, sister to Anne and George Boleyn
 Out of the Ashes (2003) – made-for-television biographical drama film, a dramatization of the life of Holocaust concentration camp survivor Gisella Perl and is based on her book I Was a Doctor in Auschwitz
 Owning Mahowny (2003) – Canadian film based on the true story of Brian Molony, a Toronto bank employee with a gambling addiction who embezzled more than $10 million to feed his gambling habit
 Paanch ( Five) (2003) – Indian crime thriller film loosely based on the 1976–77 Joshi-Abhyankar serial murders in Pune
 Paradise Found (2003) – biographical film based on the life of Post-Impressionist painter Paul Gauguin
 Party Monster (2003) – biographical drama film telling the story of the rise and fall of the infamous New York City party promoter Michael Alig
 The Pentagon Papers (2003) – made-for-television historical drama film about Daniel Ellsberg and the events leading up to the publication of the Pentagon Papers in 1971
 The Postcard Bandit (2003) – Australian made-for-television film loosely based on the life of a convicted bank robber Brenden James Abbott
 The Private Life of Samuel Pepys (2003) – British made-for-television comedy film based on the life of historical diarist Samuel Pepys
 Radio (2003) – based on the real-life story of South Carolina high school football coach Harold Jones and his mentally challenged assistant, James Robert "Radio" Kennedy, adapted from a 1996 Sports Illustrated article by Gary Smith titled "Someone to Lean On"
 The Reagans (2003) – made-for-television biographical drama film about former U.S. President Ronald Reagan and his family
 Remake (2003) – Bosnian war film telling the parallel coming-of-age stories of a father living in Sarajevo during World War II and his son living through the Siege of Sarajevo during the Bosnian War
 Return to the Batcave: The Misadventures of Adam and Burt (2003) – made-for-television biographical action-comedy film based on the 1966–1968 Batman television series which features the original stars Adam West and Burt Ward as themselves
 Right on Track (2003) – made-for-television biographical film based on Courtney and Erica Enders, two sisters who get into junior drag racing and make it all the way to the top
 Rosenstrasse (2003) – German-Dutch film that deals with the Rosenstrasse protest of 1943
 Rudy: The Rudy Giuliani Story (2003) – made-for-television biographical film depicting the life of Rudy Giuliani, focusing primarily on his mayoral career and response to the 11 September attacks
 Saints and Soldiers (2003) – war drama film loosely based on events that took place after the Malmedy massacre during the Battle of the Bulge
 Salem Witch Trials (2003) – made-for-television historical drama film depicting a dramatization of the Salem witch trials
 Saving Jessica Lynch (2003) – made-for-television film about the rescue of Jessica Lynch by an Iraqi citizen, Mohammed Odeh al-Rehaief
 Seabiscuit (2003) – based on the book Seabiscuit: An American Legend by Laura Hillenbrand about the champion American thoroughbred racehorse
 Shattered Glass (2003) – based on Stephen Glass's journalistic career at The New Republic during the mid-1990s and the discovery of his widespread journalistic fraud
 Silmido (2003) – South Korean action drama film based on the 1999 novel Silmido by Baek Dong-ho, which in turn is based on the true story of Unit 684
 Sleeping Luck (Spanish: La suerte dormida) (2003) – Spanish film based on Ángela, a lawyer who has recently lost her family, and accepts an indemnity case against a construction company for the death of one of its workers
 Soldier's Girl (2003) – Canadian-American drama film based on a story of the relationship between Barry Winchell and Calpernia Addams and the events that led up to Barry's murder by a fellow soldier
 Song for a Raggy Boy (2003) – Irish historical drama film based on the book of the same name by Patrick Galvin, about a teacher's fight against a prefect's sadistic disciplinary regime and other abuse in a Catholic Reformatory and Industrial School in 1939 Ireland
 Spinning Boris (2003) – comedy film based on the true story of three American political consultants who worked for the successful reelection campaign of Boris Yeltsin in 1996
 Spy Sorge (2003) – Japanese biographical film based on the life of Richard Sorge, a German spy for the Main Intelligence Directorate (GRU) of the Soviet Army in Japan
 Stander (2003) – based on the life and death of Andre Stander, a South African police captain turned bank robber
 Stealing Rembrandt (Danish: Rembrandt) (2003) – Danish action-comedy film concerning a father and son who accidentally steal a painting by Rembrandt
 Stealing Sinatra (2003) –  made-for-television film telling the story of the idiosyncratic kidnapping of Frank Sinatra, Jr. by Barry Keenan
 Swimming Upstream (2003) – Australian biographical drama film about Australian competitive swimmer Tony Fingleton
 Sylvia (2003) – British biographical drama film based on the real-life romance between prominent poets Sylvia Plath and Ted Hughes
 Tere Naam (2003) – Indian Hindi-language romantic drama film based on a real-life incident of a friend of director Bala, who had fallen in love, lost his mind and ended up at a mental asylum
 Veronica Guerin (2003) – based on the true story of Irish journalist Veronica Guerin
 Wonderland (2003) – based on the Wonderland murders in Los Angeles in 1981

2004 
 3: The Dale Earnhardt Story (2004) – television film about the life and death of legendary NASCAR driver Dale Earnhardt
 12 Days of Terror (2004) – based on true events that occurred in July 1916 in central and southern New Jersey; recounts 12 days during which people along the Jersey coast were subjected to attacks by a shark
 18-J (2004) – Argentine docudrama film. The film focuses on the 18 July 1994, bombing of the AMIA Building in Buenos Aires, where 18 people were killed and 300 others wounded. The perpetrators were never caught
 36 Quai des Orfèvres (2004) – French film based on a true story about two cops (Auteuil and Depardieu) are competing for the vacant seat of chief of the Paris Criminal police while involved in a search for a gang of violent thieves
 A Bear Named Winnie (2004) – made-for-television drama film concerning one of the real-life inspirations behind A.A. Milne's Winnie The Pooh
 Against the Ropes (2004) – drama based on the life of American boxing manager Jackie Kallen, the first woman to become a success in the sport
 The Alamo (2004) – about the Battle of the Alamo during the Texas Revolution
 Alexander (2004) – based on the life of Alexander the Great
 The Aryan Couple (2004) – British/American film loosely based on the life events of Hungarian Jewish industrialist Manfred Weiss and his Manfréd Weiss Steel and Metal Works
 The Assassination of Richard Nixon (2004) – the story of would-be assassin Samuel Byck, who plotted to kill Richard Nixon in 1974
 The Aviator (2004) – the story of aviator Howard Hughes
 Ay Juancito (2004) – Argentine biographical drama film about the life of Juan Duarte, Eva Perón's brother and a political officer in Juan Domingo Perón's first presidency.
 Beautiful Boxer (2004) – Thai biographical sports film about kathoey (trans woman), Muay Thai fighter, actress and model Parinya Charoenphol
 Behind the Camera: The Unauthorized Story of Charlie's Angels (2004) – made-for-television drama film documenting the success of the series Charlie's Angels, as well as the interpersonal conflicts that occurred among its staff and cast
 Bettie Page: Dark Angel (2004) – biographical drama based on the career of Bettie Page, a famous American 1950s pin-up and bondage model
 Beyond the Sea (2004) – based on the life of singer Bobby Darin
 Black Friday (2004) – Indian Hindi film based on the 1993 Bombay bombings
 The Blue Butterfly (2004) – Canadian adventure drama film based on the life of David Marenger and his trip with entomologist Georges Brossard in 1987
 Bobby Jones: Stroke of Genius (2004) – biographical drama film based on the life of golfer Bobby Jones, the only player in the sport to win all four of the men's major golf championships in a single season (1930)
 Call Me: The Rise and Fall of Heidi Fleiss (2004) – television film about Hollywood madame Heidi Fleiss
 The Clearing (2004) – drama film loosely based on the real life kidnapping of Gerrit Jan Heijn that took place in the Netherlands in 1987
 Cazuza – O Tempo Não Pára (2004) – Brazilian biographical film about the life of Brazilian singer-songwriter Cazuza
 The Chorus (French: Les Choristes) (2004) – French drama film inspired by the origin of the boys' choir The Little Singers of Paris
 Crutch (2004) – autobiographical coming of age film about writer-director Rob Moretti
 De-lovely (2004) – the story of the marriage of the songwriter Cole Porter and Linda Lee Thomas
 Downfall (German: Der Untergang) (2004) – German film based on the final twelve days of Adolf Hitler's life in his Berlin bunker and Nazi Germany in 1945
 Drum (2004) – based on the life of South African investigative journalist Henry Nxumalo
 Evilenko (2004) – Italian English-language thriller loosely based on the real life Soviet serial killer Andrei Chikatilo
 Fighter in the Wind (Korean: 바람의 파이터) (2004) – South Korean drama film telling a fictionalized account of karate competitor Choi Yeung-Eui who went to Japan during World War II to become a fighter pilot but found a very different path instead
 Finding Neverland (2004) – the story of Sir James Matthew Barrie's friendship with a family who inspired him to create Peter Pan
 First Love (Italian: Primo Amore) (2004) – erotic body horror drama film loosely based on the autobiographical novel by Marco Mariolini
 Friday Night Lights (2004) – adapted from Friday Night Lights: A Town, a Team, and a Dream by H. G. Bissinger, about the 1988 football season of Permian High School in Odessa, Texas
 Garden State (2004) – romantic Comedy-drama film centering on Andrew Largeman, a 26-year-old actor/waiter who returns to his hometown in New Jersey after his mother dies, director Zach Braff based the film on his real life experiences
 Gracie's Choice (2004) – based on a story featured in Reader's Digest, about a teenage girl trying to raise her three half-brothers and one half-sister on her own after their drug-addicted mother is sent to jail
 The Hamburg Cell (2004) – British/Canadian television film describing the creation of the Hamburg cell, an Islamist and extremist group composed by the terrorists that piloted the airplanes hijacked during the September 11 attacks
 Hawking (2004) – British made-for-television drama film about Stephen Hawking's early years as a PhD student at Cambridge University, following his search for the beginning of time, and his struggle against motor neuron disease
 Helter Skelter – made-for-television film based on the 1974 non-fiction book by Vincent Bugliosi and Curt Gentry about the murders of the Manson Family
 Hidalgo (2004) – the story of American distance rider Frank Hopkins and his mustang Hidalgo, recounting his racing his horse in Arabia in 1891 against Bedouin riding pure-blooded Arabian horses
 The Hillside Strangler (2004) – based on the true story of the Hillside Strangler serial killers, Kenneth Bianchi and Angelo Buono, Jr., who kidnapped, raped, tortured and killed girls and women in late 1977 to early 1978 in the hills above Los Angeles, California
 Holy Lola (2004) – French drama film about a French couple's efforts to adopt an orphan baby in Cambodia
 Hotel Rwanda (2004) – the story of Paul Rusesabagina's experiences during the Rwandan genocide
 Hustle (2004) – television film about the baseball player Pete Rose
 Identity Theft (2004) – crime-drama television film about the true story of Michelle Brown who has her identity stolen and $50,000 purchased under her name
 Ike: Countdown to D-Day (2004) – made-for-television historical war drama film deals with the difficult decisions Dwight D. Eisenhower made leading to up to D-Day
 Iron Jawed Angels (2004) – follows Alice Paul and the National Woman's Party's attempts to force President Wilson to grant American women the right to vote during World War I
 It's All Gone Pete Tong (2004) – British/Canadian mockumentary-drama film about a DJ who goes completely deaf
 Judas (2004) – Biblical television drama film depicting the intertwined lives of Judas Iscariot and Jesus of Nazareth
 Kaadhal (2004) – Indian Tamil romantic drama based on a true love story
 Kamaraj (2004) – Indian Tamil biographical film based on the life of Indian politician K. Kamaraj, known as the "Kingmaker" during the 1960s in India
 Kaya Taran (2004) – Indian Hindi film based on the backdrop of the 2002 Gujarat riots against Muslims and 1984 anti-Sikh riots
 Kekexili: Mountain Patrol (2004) – Chinese film inspired by the Wild Yak Brigade, a real-life volunteer group that patrolled the Tibetan Plateau during the 1990s, and events that took place between 1993 and 1996
 Khuni Shikder (Bengali: খুনী শিকদার) (2004) – Bangladeshi biographical crime thriller film based on the biography of the Bangladeshi notorious murderer Ershad Sikder
 King Arthur (2004) – British-American historical adventure film about King Arthur
 Kinsey (2004) – a look at the life of Alfred Kinsey, a pioneer in human sexuality research
 The Last Shot (2004) – action comedy film loosely based on the true story of an FBI sting operation code-named Dramex
 The Libertine (2004) – British-Australian drama film about John Wilmot, 2nd Earl of Rochester, a notorious rake and libertine poet in the court of King Charles II of England
 The Life and Death of Peter Sellers (2004) – British-American television film about the life of English comedian Peter Sellers
 The Long Shot (2004) – drama film about a woman who moves with her husband and seven-year-old daughter from Colorado to California and finds solace while working at a horse farm and decides to enter her beloved horse in a high-stakes riding competition
The Love Crimes of Gillian Guess (2004) – Canadian drama film loosely based on the real-life story of Gillian Guess, who was convicted of obstruction of justice in 1998 after she became romantically involved with an accused murderer while serving as a juror at his trial
 Love in Thoughts (German: Was nützt die Liebe in Gedanken) (2004) – German film about the so-called "Steglitz school tragedy" that occurred in 1927, when Günther Scheller and Paul Krantz founded a "suicide club"
 Man in the Mirror: The Michael Jackson Story (2004) – Canadian-American made-for-television biographical film about American pop star Michael Jackson, and follows his rise to fame and subsequent events
 Miracle (2004) – the story of Herb Brooks and the U.S. Olympic hockey team leading up to, and during, the 1980 Winter Olympics
 Miracle Run (2004) – drama film about a mom parenting her fraternal twin sons after they're diagnosed with autism
 Modigliani (2004) – biographical drama film based on the life of the Italian artist Amedeo Modigliani
 The Motorcycle Diaries (Spanish: Diarios de motocicleta) (2004) – biographical film about the early life of Che Guevara
 My Nikifor (Polish: Mój Nikifor) (2004) – Polish drama film based on the life of Nikifor, a folk and naïve painter
 The Mystery of Natalie Wood (2004) – made-for-television biographical film depicting the life and career of actress Natalie Wood, from her early childhood in the 1940s until her death in 1981
 Nero (2004) – Italian-British-Spanish made-for-television historical film about Roman emperor Nero
 Netaji Subhas Chandra Bose: The Forgotten Hero (2004) – Indian epic biographical war film. The film depicts the life of the Indian independence leader Subhas Chandra Bose in Nazi Germany: 1941–1943, and in Japanese-occupied Asia 1943–1945, and the events leading to the formation of Azad Hind Fauj
 The Ninth Day (German: Der neunte Tag) (2004) – German historical drama film about a Catholic priest from Luxembourg who is imprisoned in Dachau concentration camp, but released for nine days, based on a portion of Pfarrerblock 25487, the diary of Father Jean Bernard (1907–1994)
 Nobody Knows (Japanese: Dare mo Shiranai) (2004) – Japanese drama film based on the 1988 Sugamo child abandonment case
 Not Only But Always (2004) – British TV film telling the story of the working and personal relationship between the comedians Peter Cook and Dudley Moore, a hugely popular duo in the UK during the 1960s and 1970s
 Olga (2004) – Brazilian biographical film about German-Brazilian communist militant Olga Benário Prestes
 The Passion of the Christ (2004) – biblical drama film about Jesus of Nazareth
 The Perfect Husband: The Laci Peterson Story (2004) – made-for-television crime film based on the murder of Laci Peterson
 The Preacher (Dutch: De Dominee) (2004) – Dutch thriller film based on Bart Middelburg's biography of drug lord Klaas Bruinsma (named Klaas Donkers in the film)
 Prom Queen: The Marc Hall Story (2004) – Canadian television film based on the 2002 court case Marc Hall v. Durham Catholic School Board
 Ray (2004) – biographical film about singer Ray Charles
 Redemption: The Stan Tookie Williams Story (2004) – made-for-television biographical crime drama film about the life of Stanley Tookie Williams, the co-founding member of the Crips street gang, principally his life in the streets and his life in prison
 The Remains of Nothing (Italian: Il resto di niente) (2004) – Italian Historical drama film about Eleonora Pimentel
 Rikidōzan (Korean: Yeokdosan) (2004) – Japanese/South Korean biographical sports drama film based on the life of Rikidōzan, a legendary ethnic Korean professional wrestler who became a national hero in Japan in the 1950s
 The Riverman (2004) – biographical crime drama television film based on the 2004 non-fiction book The Riverman: Ted Bundy and I Hunt for the Green River Killer by Robert D. Keppel and William J. Birnes
 The Rocket Post (2004) – British drama film very loosely based on experiments in 1934 by the German inventor Gerhard Zucker to provide a postal service to the island of Scarp by rocket mail
 Romasanta (2004) – Spanish/Italian/British horror film about Manuel Blanco Romasanta, Spain's first documented serial killer
 Saint John Bosco: Mission to Love (Italian: Don Bosco) (2004) – Italian television film based on real life events of Roman Catholic priest John Bosco
 Saint Rita (Italian: Rita da Cascia) (2004) – Italian television film based on real life events of Augustinian nun and Saint Rita of Cascia
 The Sea Inside (Spanish: Mar adentro) (2004) – Spanish drama film based on the real-life story of Ramón Sampredro, who was left quadriplegic after a diving accident, and his 28-year campaign in support of euthanasia and the right to end his life
 Soba (2004) – Mexican independent drama/crime film based on the true story of three girls raped by a group of cops in Tláhuac, Mexico City
 Something the Lord Made (2004) – made-for-television biographical drama film about the black cardiac pioneer Vivien Thomas (1910–1985) and his complex and volatile partnership with white surgeon Alfred Blalock (1899–1964), the "Blue Baby doctor" who pioneered modern heart surgery
 Stage Beauty (2004) – romantic period drama based on 17th-century English actor Edward Kynaston
 Suburban Madness (2004) – crime drama television film loosely based on the true story of 44-year-old Clara Harris, a successful Texas dentist and mother of young twins, who hired private investigator Bobbi Bacha, and eventually killed her husband
 The Terminal (2004) – comedy-drama film partially inspired by the true story of the 18-year stay of Mehran Karimi Nasseri in Terminal 1 of Paris-Charles de Gaulle Airport, France, from 1988 to 2006
 Troy (2004) – epic historical war drama film loosely based on Homer's Iliad in its narration of the entire story of the decade-long Trojan War – condensed into little more than a couple of weeks, rather than just the quarrel between Achilles and Agamemnon in the ninth year
 Voces inocentes ( Innocent Voices) (2004) – Salvadoran war film set during the Salvadoran Civil War, and based on writer Óscar Torres's childhood
 Walking Tall (2004) – action film, remake of the 1973 film of the same name, about a former U.S. soldier who returns to his hometown to find it overrun by crime and corruption

2005 
 A Friend of the Family (2005) – Canadian TV film based on Alison Shaw's 1998 book of the same name, about the true story of David Snow, the "Cottage Killer"
 Ambulance Girl (2005) – made-for-television film based on the memoir by Jane Stern, Ambulance Girl: How I Saved Myself by Becoming an EMT
 An American Haunting (2005) – horror film based on the novel The Bell Witch: An American Haunting by Brent Monahan, about the legend of the Bell Witch
 Aurore (2005) – biographical drama based on the murder of Aurore Gagnon, a Canadian child abuse victim
 Capote (2005) – biographical film about Truman Capote who, during his research for his book In Cold Blood, an account of the murder of a Kansas family, develops a close relationship with murderer Perry Smith
 Cinderella Man (2005) – based on the story of James J. Braddock, a supposedly washed-up boxer who comes back to become a champion and an inspiration in the 1930s
 Coach Carter (2005) – based on the Richmond High School basketball team led by coach Ken Carter
 Code Breakers (2005) – television film following the Heisman Trophy presentation, based on the first three chapters of the 2000 novel A Return to Glory, chronicling the 1951 cheating scandal at West Point and its impact on Army's football team, which was forced to cut loose virtually its entire squad
 David & Layla (2005) – independent film inspired by a true story of a Jew and a Muslim falling in love in New York
 Dawn Anna (2005) – television film based upon real events surrounding the Columbine High School massacre
 Devaki (2005) – Indian Hindi film based on a real-life incident where a tribal woman named Devakibai was sold in an open auction in Pandhana, a sub-division of Khandwa district in Madhya Pradesh, in January 2003
 Domino (2005) – inspired by Domino Harvey, the English daughter of stage and screen actor Laurence Harvey, who became a Los Angeles bounty hunter
 Dreamer (2005) – loosely inspired by the story of the mare Mariah's Storm, a promising filly who was being pointed towards the Breeders' Cup Juvenile Fillies in 1993
 Duma (2005) – family drama adventure film about a young South African boy's friendship with an orphaned cheetah, based on How It Was with Dooms by Carol Cawthra Hopcraft and Xan Hopcraft
 Dynasty: The Making of a Guilty Pleasure (2005) – made-for-television biographical film based on the creation and behind the scenes production of the 1980s prime time soap opera Dynasty
 End of the Spear (2005) – drama film that recounts the story of Operation Auca, in which five American Christian missionaries attempted to evangelize the Huaorani (Waodani) people of the tropical rain forest of Eastern Ecuador
 The Exonerated (2005) – television film that dramatizes the true stories of six people who have been wrongfully convicted of murder and other offenses, placed on death row, and later exonerated and freed after serving varying years in prison
 The Exorcism of Emily Rose (2005) – supernatural horror crime drama film loosely based on the story of Anneliese Michel and follows a self-proclaimed agnostic who acts as defense counsel representing a parish priest, accused by the state of negligent homicide after he performed an exorcism
 Faith of My Fathers (2005) – television film based on the 1999 memoir of the same name by United States Senator and former United States Navy aviator John McCain (with Mark Salter), about John McCain's experiences as a prisoner of war in North Vietnam for five and a half years during the Vietnam War
 Fateless (Hungarian: Sorstalanság) (2005) – Hungarian film based on the semi-autobiographical novel Fatelessness by Imre Kertész, about the story of a teenage boy who is sent to Auschwitz and Buchenwald
 Fighting the Odds: The Marilyn Gambrell Story – television film based on Marilyn Gambrell
 Firecracker (2005) – thriller film about a young boy from a dysfunctional home who went to a carnival and met a singer, after which a murder took place
 The Game of Their Lives (2005) – based on the true story of the 1950 U.S. soccer team which, against all odds, beat England 1–0 in the city of Belo Horizonte, Brazil during the 1950 FIFA World Cup
 Get Rich or Die Tryin' (2005) – biographical film about rapper Curtis "50 Cent" Jackson
 Gie (2005) – Indonesian biopic film about the story of Soe Hok Gie, a graduate from University of Indonesia who was known as an activist and nature lover
 Good Night, and Good Luck (2005) – chronicles Edward R. Murrow's opposition to senator Joseph McCarthy during the anti-Communist senate hearings of the mid-1950s
 The Great Raid (2005) – the story of the raid at Cabanatuan on the Philippine island of Luzon during World War II
 The Greatest Game Ever Played (2005) – based on the life of golfer Francis Ouimet
 Green River Killer (2005) – based on real-life serial killer Gary Ridgway
 Heart of the Beholder (2005) – drama film based on Ken Tipton's experiences as the owner of a chain of videocassette rental stores in the 1980s
 Jarhead (2005) – based on the Gulf War memoir of Anthony Swofford
 Joyeux Noël ( Merry Christmas) (2005) – French/German/British/Belgian/Romanian epic war drama film based on the Christmas truce of December 1914, depicted through the eyes of French, Scottish, and German soldiers
 Kingdom of Heaven (2005) – epic historical drama film set during the Crusades of the 12th Century, a French village blacksmith goes to the aid of the Kingdom of Jerusalem in its defense against the Ayyubid Muslim Sultan, Saladin, who is fighting to claim the city from the Christians; this leads to the Battle of Hattin
 Kinky Boots (2005) – British/American comedy-drama film based on the true story of a struggling British shoe factory's young, strait-laced owner, Charlie, who forms an unlikely partnership with Lola, a drag queen, to save the business
 Knights of the South Bronx (2005) – television film based on the true story of David MacEnulty, who taught schoolchildren of the Bronx Community Elementary School 70 to play at competition level, eventually winning New York City and the New York State Chess Championships
 Last Days (2005) – drama film, a fictionalized account of the last days of a musician, loosely based on Kurt Cobain
 The Last Hangman (2005) – based on the life and career of British executioner Albert Pierrepont, from early 1933 through the end of his career in 1955, during which he executed some 608 people, including the Nuremberg war criminals and Ruth Ellis, the last women to be executed in Britain
 Lies My Mother Told Me (2005) – Canadian television movie based on the real life murder of Larry McNabney by his wife, Elisa McNabney, with the help of a college student
 Loggerheads (2005) – independent film about the story of an adoption "triad"—birth mother, child, and adoptive parents—each in three interwoven stories in the days leading up to Mother's Day, and each in one of the three distinctive geographical regions of North Carolina: Appalachian Mountains, Piedmont (a broad, gently hilly plateau) and Atlantic Coastal Plain
 Lord of War (2005) – crime drama film, inspired by the stories of several real-life arms dealers and smugglers
 Lords of Dogtown (2005) – biographical film based on the documentary Dogtown and Z-Boys about an influential group of skateboarders who revolutionized the sport
 Mozart and the Whale (2005) – romantic comedy-drama film about the love story between two savants with Asperger's syndrome, based on Jerry Newport and Mary Meinel
 Mrs. Henderson Presents (2005) – British/American biographical musical film telling the true story of Laura Henderson, an eccentric British socialite who opened the Windmill Theatre in London in 1931
 Mrs. Harris (2005) – American/British made-for-television drama film based on the book Very Much a Lady by Shana Alexander, focusing on the tempestuous relationship between Herman Tarnower, noted cardiologist and author of The Complete Scarsdale Medical Diet, and headmistress Jean Harris
 Munich (2005) – loosely based on Operation Wrath of God following the aftermath of the Munich massacre
 Murder in the Hamptons (2005) – Canadian television film based on the events leading to the murder of multi-millionaire Ted Ammon and the conviction of Ted's estranged wife's lover Daniel Pelosi
 Murder Unveiled (2005) – Canadian television film based on the true story of the Jaswinder Kaur Sidhu murder
 Netaji Subhas Chandra Bose: The Forgotten Hero (2005) – Indian epic biographical war film depicting the life of the Indian independence leader Subhas Chandra Bose in Nazi Germany: 1941–1943, and in Japanese-occupied Asia 1943–1945, and the events leading to the formation of Azad Hind Fauj
 The New World (2005) – depicts the founding of the Jamestown, Virginia, settlement, inspired by the historical figures Captain John Smith and Pocahontas
 North Country (2005) – drama film chronicling the case of Jenson v. Eveleth Taconite Co., which changed sexual harassment law
 Our Fathers (2005) – made-for-television drama film based on the book Our Fathers: The Secret Life of the Catholic Church in an Age of Scandal by David France
 Parzania (2005) – Indian drama film inspired by the true story of a ten-year-old Parsi boy, Azhar Mody (named Parzaan Pithawala in the film) who disappeared after the 28 February 2002 Gulbarg Society massacre during which 69 people were killed and which was one of many events in the communal riots in Gujarat in 2002
 The Prize Winner of Defiance, Ohio (2005) – biographical film based on the book by Terry Ryan, about the true story of housewife Evelyn Ryan, who helped support her husband, Kelly, and their 10 children by winning jingle-writing contests
 Romanzo criminale (2005) – Italian film based on Giancarlo De Cataldo's 2002 novel, which is in turn inspired by the Banda della Magliana true story
 Sehar (2005) – Indian Hindi film depicting organized crime in the late 1990s in India, loosely based on real-life gangster and hired killer Shri Prakash Shukla
 Shooting Dogs (Beyond the Gates in the United States) (2005) – British/German film based on events during the early days of the Rwandan genocide
 Sins (2005) – Bollywood film based on the true story of a Catholic priest from Kerala who was hanged due to his sexual relationship with a married woman
 Sometimes in April (2005) – made-for-television historical drama film about the Rwandan genocide
 Sophie Scholl – The Final Days (German: Sophie Scholl – Die letzten Tage) (2005) – German historical drama film about the last days in the life of Sophie Scholl, a 21-year-old member of the anti-Nazi non-violent student resistance group the White Rose, part of the German Resistance movement
 Spirit Bear: The Simon Jackson Story (2005) – Canadian independent film based on the real life campaign by Spirit Bear Youth Coalition founder Simon Jackson to save the habitat of the Kermode bear
 Stoned (2005) – British biographical drama film about Brian Jones, the founder and original leader of the English rock band The Rolling Stones
 Syriana (2005) – geopolitical thriller film loosely based on the book See No Evil by Robert Baer, a former FBI agent, based on his experiences
 Taj Mahal: An Eternal Love Story (2005) – Indian historical drama film about Mughal emperor Shah Jahan, who commissioned the built of the Taj Mahal in 1632
 Two Sons of Francisco (Portuguese: 2 Filhos de Francisco) (2005) – Brazilian drama film about the lives of the musicians Zezé Di Camargo & Luciano
 Virginia, la monaca di Monza (2005) – Italian/Spanish television film loosely based on real life events of Marianna de Leyva
 Walk the Line (2005) – based on two autobiographies of American singer Johnny Cash, Man in Black and Cash: The Autobiography
 Wallis & Edward (2005) – British television film, dramatizing the events of the Edward VIII abdication crisis
 The White Masai (German: Die weiße Massai) (2005) – German film based on an autobiographical novel of the same name by the German born writer Corinne Hofmann
 Wolf Creek (2005) – inspired by the Backpacker murders by Ivan Milat
 The World's Fastest Indian (2005) – the life story of New Zealander Burt Munro, who spent years building a 1920 Indian motorcycle, a bike which helped him set the land-speed world record at Utah's Bonneville Salt Flats in 1967
 You Are My Sunshine (Korean: Neoneun nae unmyeong) (2005) – South Korean film about a farmer who falls in love with a local dabang delivery girl, Eun-ha, who, shortly after their marriage tests positive for HIV/AIDS
 The Zodiac (2005) – about the Zodiac Killer

2006 
 10th & Wolf (2006) – based on a true story of a mob war in South Philadelphia
 300 (2006) – fictionalized account of the Battle of Thermopylae, based on the comic series written by Frank Miller
 A Girl Like Me: The Gwen Araujo Story (2006) – biographical drama television film dramatizing the events surrounding the 2002 murder of Gwen Araujo, a transgender teenager
 A Guide to Recognizing Your Saints (2006) – drama film based on a 2001 memoir of the same name by author, director, and musician Dito Montiel, which describes his youth in Astoria, New York during the 1980s
 A Little Thing Called Murder (2006) – made-for-television drama film based on a true story of convicted murderer Sante Kimes
 After Thomas (2006) – British drama film, about the severely autistic child Kyle Graham and the progress he makes when his parents adopt Thomas, a golden retriever, based on the true story of Scottish child Dale Gardner and his dog Henry
 Alpha Dog (2006) – crime drama based on the kidnap and murder of 15-year-old Nicholas Markowitz and surrounding events in 2000, organized mainly by Jesse James Hollywood, a young middle-class drug dealer in California
 Amazing Grace (2006) – the story of William Wilberforce's fight to outlaw the slave trade in the British parliament
 The Amazing Grace (2006) – British-Nigerian historical drama film telling the reformation story of British slave trader John Newton sailing to what is now Nigeria to buy slaves. Later, increasingly shocked by the brutality of slavery, he gave up the trade and became an Anglican priest
 The Art of Crying (Danish: Kunsten at Græde i Kor) (2006) – Danish tragicomedy about an 11-year-old boy's struggle to hold intact his bizarre family with its abusive father, mother in denial, and rebellious sister during the social unrest of the early 1970s, based upon an autobiographical novel by Erling Jepsen
 Beau Brummell: This Charming Man (2006) – British made-for-television biographical film about the life of Beau Brummell
 Black Book (Dutch: Zwartboek) (2006) – Dutch film loosely based on the story of Esmée van Eeghen (named Rachel Stein in the film), a young Jewish girl, who started an affair with a German officer
 The Black Dahlia (2006) – based loosely on the true story of the unsolved Black Dahlia homicide in January 1947
 Bobby (2006) – based on speculated events leading to the shooting of Robert F. Kennedy at The Ambassador Hotel in 1968
 The Borgia (Spanish: Los Borgia) (2006) – Spanish-Italian biographical film depicting the story of the Borgia dynasty
 Buenos Aires, 1977 (a.k.a. Chronicle of an Escape) (Spanish: Crónica de una fuga) (2006) – Argentinian political thriller film which tells the true story of four men who narrowly escaped death at the hands of a military death squad during the Argentine Dirty War in the 1970s
 Cannibal (2006) – German direct-to-video horror film based on the true story of Armin Meiwes who killed and ate a man whom he met on the Internet
 Catch a Fire (2006) – based on the experiences of former migrant worker turned Umkhonto we Sizwe member Patrick Chamusso during apartheid in the 1980s
 Christmas at Maxwell's (2006) – independent drama film based upon director William C. Laufer's real-life experiences 
 Color of the Cross (2006) – Christian film telling the story of Jesus as a black man, and portrays Jesus' persecution as the result of racism
 Copying Beethoven (2006) – biographical film depicting the last years of German composer and pianist Ludwig van Beethoven
 The Death of Poe (2006) –  biographical film that tells the tragic story of the mysterious disappearance and death of the American author Edgar Allan Poe
 Dresden (2006) – German film depicting a romance story during the historical attack against the city of Dresden in February 1945
 Eduart (2006) – Greek drama film about Eduart, a young man raised in a cruel and oppressive family environment, who leaves Albania with the dream of becoming a rock star and living a better life
 Eight Below (2006) – survival drama film, an American remake based on the 1983 Japanese film Antarctica about 15 Sakhalin Husky sled dogs who were abandoned when an Antarctica expedition team was unable to return to the base
 El Benny (2006) – Cuban film depicting a fictionalized version of the life of the famous Cuban musician Benny Moré
 El Cantante (2006) – biographical film based on the life of the late salsa singer Héctor Lavoe
 Factory Girl (2006) – biographical film based on the rapid rise and fall of 1960s underground film star and socialite Edie Sedgwick known for her association with the artist Andy Warhol
 Faith like Potatoes (2006) – South African biographical drama film based on the 1998 book of the same name written by Angus Buchan, following Buchan and his family's move from Zambia to South Africa and chronicles his Christian faith throughout that time
 Fearless (Chinese: 霍元甲) (2006) – martial arts film loosely based on the life of Huo Yuanjia, a Chinese martial artist who challenged foreign fighters in highly publicized events, restoring pride and nationalism to China at a time when Western imperialism and Japanese manipulation were eroding the country in the final years of the Qing Dynasty before the birth of the Republic of China
 Find Me Guilty (2006) – based on the trial of mobster Giacomo "Jackie" DiNorscio, which became the longest Mafia trial in American history
 Flags of Our Fathers (2006) – based on the book Flags of Our Fathers, about the Battle of Iwo Jima and the raising of the flag on Iwo Jima
 Flight 93 (2006) – based on the events aboard United Airlines Flight 93 on 9/11
 Flyboys (2006) – war drama film loosely based on the enlistment, training, and combat experiences of a group of young Americans who volunteer to become fighter pilots in the Lafayette Escadrille, the 124th air squadron formed by the French in 1916
 The Flying Scotsman (2006) – British drama film based on the life and career of Scottish amateur cyclist Graeme Obree
 For One Night (2006) – television film based on the true story of Gerica McCrary, who made headlines in 2002 by getting Taylor County High School in her hometown of Butler, Georgia, to integrate the prom after thirty-one years of segregation
 Fur (2006) – largely fictionalized biography of iconic American photographer Diane Arbus, who was known for her strange, disturbing images
 Ghosts (2006) – British drama film based on the 2004 Morecambe Bay cockling disaster
 Glory Road (2006) – based on the story of the 1965–66 Texas Western Miners basketball team and its march to the national championship, although some liberties were taken
 The Good Shepherd (2006) – spy film, a fictional film loosely based on real events, but advertised as telling the untold story of the birth of counter-intelligence in the Central Intelligence Agency (CIA)
 Goya's Ghosts (2006) – biographical drama film loosely based on Francisco Goya, a renowned painter who did portraits as the Official Court Painter to Spain's royalty, among others, during the French Revolution
 Gridiron Gang (2006) – based on real incidents involving youth gang members in a youth jail named "Killpatrick Camp" who played for a football team led by coach Sean Porter
 Grimm Love (German: Rohtenburg) (2006) – German psychological horror film inspired by the Armin Meiwes cannibal murder case
 The Hands (Spanish: Las manos) (2006) – Argentinean/Italian film inspired by the life and work of Catholic priest Mario Pantaleo
 Heavens Fall (2006) – based on the Scottsboro Boys incident of 1931
 The Hoax (2006) – recounting Clifford Irving's elaborate hoax on publishing an autobiography of Howard Hughes in the early 1970s
 Hollywoodland (2006) – based on the suspicious death of actor George Reeves on 16 June 1959
 Housewife, 49 (2006) – television film based on the wartime diaries of Nella Last
 Infamous (2006) – while researching his book In Cold Blood, writer Truman Capote develops a close relationship with convicted murderers Dick Hickock and Perry Smith
 Invincible (2006) – based on the story of Vince Papale, who played for the Philadelphia Eagles in the 1970s as a walk-on
 Karla (2006) – based on the true story of serial killers Paul Bernardo and Karla Homolka
 The Killing of John Lennon (2006) – the story of Mark Chapman's plot to kill John Lennon
 Klimt (2006) – Austrian art-house biographical film about the life of the Austrian Symbolist painter Gustav Klimt
 Kokoda (2006) – Australian war film based on the experiences of Australian troops fighting Japanese forces during the 1942 Kokoda Track campaign
 The Last King of Scotland (2006) – based on factual events during Idi Amin's rule of Uganda
 Life Is Not A Fairy Tale: The Fantasia Barrino Story (2006) – made-for-television biographical film based on the life of American singer Fantasia Barrino
 Lonely Hearts (2006) – loosely based on the investigation of homicide detective Elmer C. Robinson into the Lonely Hearts Killers, directed by his own grandson Todd Robinson
 Marie Antoinette (2006) – based on the life of Marie Antoinette, the last queen of France, from her betrothal and marriage to Louis XVI to her reign as queen to the French Revolution
 Milarepa (2006) – Bhutanese Tibetan-language film about the life of the most famous Tibetan tantric yogi, the eponymous Milarepa
 Miss Potter (2006) – British-American biographical film about children's author and illustrator Beatrix Potter
 Mysterious Creatures (2006) – British indie drama about the true story of a married couple struggling to cope with the demands of their daughter with Asperger syndrome
 Not Like Everyone Else (2006) – made-for-television based on a true story of events that happened to Brandi Blackbear in 1999–2000
 One Night with the King (2006) – historical epic film, a dramatization of the Biblical story of Esther, who risked her life by approaching the King of Persia to request that he save the Jewish people
 Only the Brave (2006) – the story of the rescue of the Lost Battalion by the 442nd Regimental Combat Team during World War II
 Open Water 2: Adrift (2006) – German/American psychological thriller inspired by the short story Adrift by Japanese author Koji Suzuki, from which it took its original title, but promotional posters claimed the film is based on actual events. The film has no connection to Open Water (2003)
 Out of the Blue (2006) – New Zealand crime drama film based on the Aramoana massacre
 Pacquiao: The Movie (2006) – Filipino action-drama film based on a true story of Filipino boxer Emmanuel "Manny" Pacquiao
 Peaceful Warrior (2006) – American/German drama film based on the part-fictional, part-autobiographical 1980 novel Way of the Peaceful Warrior by Dan Millman
 Pinochet in Suburbia (2006) – drama film about former Chilean dictator Augusto Pinochet and the attempts to extradite him from Great Britain during his visit there in 1998 for medical treatment
 Provoked (2006) – based on the true story of Kiranjit Ahluwalia, who murdered her abusive husband
 The Pursuit of Happyness (2006) – based on the true story of Chris Gardner's nearly one-year struggle with homelessness
 The Queen (2006) – after the death of Princess Diana, HM Queen Elizabeth II struggles with her reaction to a sequence of events nobody could have predicted
 Raising Jeffrey Dahmer (2006) – drama film based on the case of serial killer Jeffrey Dahmer
 Rampage: The Hillside Strangler Murders (2006) – direct-to-video crime thriller about the Hillside Strangler murders
 Rapid Fire (2006) – action television film based on the 1980 Norco shootout
 Requiem (2006) – German drama film focusing on the medical condition (epilepsy) as seen in the real-life events of Anneliese Michel (named Michaela Klingler in the film), a German woman who was allegedly possessed by six or more demons and died in 1976
 Rescue Dawn (2006) – based on the story of Dieter Dengler, a U.S. Navy pilot who was shot down in Laos during the Vietnam War
 The Ron Clark Story (2006) – television film based on the real-life educator Ron Clark
 Running with Scissors (2006) – comedy-drama film based on Augusten Burroughs' 2002 memoir of the same name
 Salvador (2006) – Spanish film based on the 2001 Francesc Escribano book , which depicts the time Salvador Puig Antich spent on death row prior to his execution by garrote (the last person to be executed by this method), under Franco's Francoist State in 1974
 See No Evil: The Moors Murders (2006) – two-part British television series telling the story of the Moors murders, which were committed, between July 1963 and October 1965, by Myra Hindley and Ian Brady
 Take the Lead (2006) – based on the story of Pierre Dulaine, a well-known ballroom dancer and dance instructor, known for "Dancing Classrooms", as he teaches potential high school dropouts how to ballroom dance during detention in an attempt to raise their self-respect and confidence
 Traces of Love (Korean: Gaeulro ) (2006) – Korean film based on the Sampoong Department Store collapse of 1995
 United 93 (2006) – based on United Airlines Flight 93 and the passengers on board who prevented the hijackers from reaching their intended target
 Walkout (2006) – based on the true story of the 1968 East L.A. walkouts, also referred to as the Chicano blowouts
 We Are Marshall (2006) – the story of the aftermath of the 1970 plane crash that killed 5 members of flight crew, 25 boosters, 8 coaches and 37 players of the Marshall University football team
 White Palms (Hungarian: Fehér tenyér) (2006) – Hungarian film based partly on elements of the director's life and partly on events with other real people
 Why I Wore Lipstick to My Mastectomy (2006) – television film based on the memoir of the same name, written by Geralyn Lucas, depicting Lucas's fight with breast cancer
 Wild Romance (2006) – Dutch biographical about Dutch singer and artist Herman Brood
 Woh Lamhe... ( Those Moments) (2006) – Indian romantic drama film supposedly based on actress Parveen Babi's life, her battle with schizophrenia and her relationship with Mahesh Bhatt
 World Trade Center (2006) – based on the rescue of John McLoughlin and Will Jimeno, both freed from the wreckage of the collapsing World Trade Center towers

2007 
 26 Years Diary (Korean: Anata wo Wasurenai) (2007) – South Korean biographical film that tells the story of Lee Su-hyon's life and death
 1612 (2007) – Russian epic historical drama film about the 17th century Time of Troubles and the Polish-Muscovite War with the Polish-Lithuanian Commonwealth
 A Life Interrupted (2007) – made-for-television film depicting events in the life of sexual assault victim Debbie Smith, which led to the passage of the Debbie Smith Act
 A Mighty Heart (2007) – based on the murder of American journalist Daniel Pearl in Pakistan
 A Secret (French: Un secret) (2007) – French film based on the 2004 autobiographical novel by Philippe Grimbert
 Alexandra (Russian: Aleksandra) (2007) – Russian film about the Second Chechen War
 American Gangster (2007) – based on the true life story of Frank Lucas, a former heroin dealer, and organized crime boss in Harlem during the late 1960s and early 1970s
 An American Crime (2007) – crime drama based on the torture and murder of Sylvia Likens by Indianapolis housewife Gertrude Baniszewski
 The Anna Nicole Smith Story (2007) – biographical film depicting the life of American model and actress Anna Nicole Smith
 The Assassination of Jesse James by the Coward Robert Ford (2007) – based on the last year of Jesse James' life, leading up to his assassination by Robert Ford
 Bastard Boys (2007) – two-part Australian television miniseries telling the story of the 1998 Australian waterfront dispute
 Battle in Seattle (2007) – based on the protest activity at the World Trade Organization Ministerial Conference of 1999
 Becoming Jane (2007) – biographical portrait of a pre-fame Jane Austen and her romance with a young Irishman
 The Black Pimpernel (Swedish: Svarta nejlikan) (2007) – Swedish biographical film about Harald Edelstam, Sweden's ambassador to Chile, who after the military coup of Augusto Pinochet in 1973, managed to save the lives of more than 1,300 people by taking them to his embassy and transporting them to Sweden
 Black Water (2007) – Australian horror film inspired by the true story of a crocodile attack in Australia's Northern Territory in December 2003
 Borderland (2007) – loosely based on serial killer and cult leader Adolfo Constanzo
 Bordertown (2007) – drama film inspired by the true story of the numerous female homicides in Ciudad Juárez and tells the story of an inquisitive American reporter sent in by her American newspaper to investigate the murders
 Breach (2007) – based on the capture of Soviet spy Robert Hanssen
 Bury My Heart at Wounded Knee (2007) – Western historical drama television film adapted from the 1970 non-fiction book of the same name
 California Dreamin' (Romanian: California Dreamin' (nesfârșit)) (2007) – Romanian film based on the true story of a train containing American radar equipment required in Kosovo that was stopped for four days in a small village on the Bărăgan Plain during the 1999 NATO bombing of the Federal Republic of Yugoslavia
 Caravaggio (2007) – Italian television film based on the real life events of Baroque painter Michelangelo Merisi de Caravaggio
 Chapter 27 (2007) – biographical film depicting the murder of John Lennon by Mark David Chapman
 Charlie Wilson's War (2007) – based on Texas congressman Charlie Wilson's covert dealings in Afghanistan to help launch Operation Cyclone, a program to organize and support the Afghan mujahideen during the Soviet–Afghan War
 Chicago Massacre: Richard Speck (2007) – based on the notorious mass murderer Richard Speck, who systematically tortured, raped and murdered a group of student nurses from South Chicago Community Hospital in 1966
 Colour Me Kubrick (2007) – British comedy-drama film loosely based on Alan Conway, a British con-man who had been impersonating director Stanley Kubrick since the early 1990s, the film follows the exploits of Conway as he goes from person to person, convincing them to give out money, liquor and sexual favours for the promise of a part in "Kubrick's" next film
 Control (2007) – based on the story of Ian Curtis, the singer of Joy Division, whose personal, professional and romantic life led him to commit suicide at the age of 23
 The Counterfeiters (German: Die Fälscher) (2007) – Austrian film based on Operation Bernhard
 Crazy (2007) –  independent biographical musical drama film inspired by the life of Nashville guitarist Hank Garland
 Curse of the Zodiac (2007) – horror film based on the Zodiac killings in the San Francisco Bay area in the early 1970s
 Dark Matter (2007) – drama film loosely based on the University of Iowa shooting in 1991
 Death Defying Acts (2007) – British/Australian romance film about the life of Hungarian-American escapologist Harry Houdini at the height of his career in the 1920s
 Diana: Last Days of a Princess (2007) – made-for-television film depicting a semi-fictionalized account of the last two months in the life of Diana, Princess of Wales, leading up to her death on 31 August 1997
 The Diving Bell and the Butterfly (French: Le Scaphandre et le Papillon) (2007) – French biographical drama based on the life of Jean-Dominique Bauby, depicting his life after suffering a massive stroke in December 1995 at the age of 43, which left him with a condition known as locked-in syndrome
 Don't Waste Your Time, Johnny! (Italian: Lascia perdere, Johnny!) (2007) – Italian biographical comedy drama loosely based on real life events of musician Fausto Mesolella, a member of Piccola Orchestra Avion Travel
 Ed Gein: The Butcher of Plainfield (2007) – based on the crimes of Ed Gein
 Eichmann (2007) – British biographical drama detailing the interrogation of Adolf Eichmann
 Eight Miles High (German: Das wilde Leben) (2007) – German biographical motion picture, set in the 1960s and depicting the "wild life" of Uschi Obermaier, a West German sex symbol and icon of the era
 El Greco (2007) – Greek biographical film about the life of the Greek painter of the Spanish Renaissance, Domenicos Theotokopoulos, known worldwide as El Greco 
 Elizabeth: The Golden Age (2007) – sequel to the 1998 film Elizabeth, depicting a mature Queen Elizabeth I of England, who endures multiple crises late in her reign, including court intrigues, an assassination plot, the Spanish Armada, and romantic disappointments
 The Final Season (2007) – baseball film based on the true story of Kent Stock, who in 1991 becomes the head coach of the Norway High School Tigers baseball team
 Freedom Writers (2007) – based on the book The Freedom Writers Diary by teacher Erin Gruwell, based on Woodrow Wilson Classical High School in Eastside, Long Beach, California
 Gandhi, My Father (2007) – Indian biographical drama film about the troubled relationship between Mahatma Gandhi and his son Harilal Gandhi
 Genghis Khan: To the Ends of the Earth and Sea (Japanese: 蒼き狼 地果て海尽きるまで) (2007) – Japanese historical drama film depicting the life of Genghis Khan
 Georg (2007) – Estonian biographical drama film about Estonian singer Georg Ots
 The Girl Next Door (2007) – horror film loosely based on the torture and murder of Sylvia Likens by Indianapolis housewife Gertrude Baniszewski and based on the book The Girl Next Door, written by Jack Ketchum
 Goodbye Bafana (2007) – based on the relationship between Nelson Mandela and writer James Gregory
 Gracie (2007) – sports drama film partially based on the childhood experiences of Elisabeth Shue
 The Gray Man (2007) – biographical thriller film based on the actual life and events of American serial killer, rapist and cannibal Albert Fish
 The Great Debaters (2007) – the story of the efforts of debate coach Melvin B. Tolson (Denzel Washington) at historically black Wiley College to place his team on equal footing with whites in the American South during the 1930s
 Guru (2007) – Indian bi-language (Hindi and Tamil) film loosely based on the life of Indian business tycoon Dhirubhai Ambani, who helped found Reliance Industries in Mumbai, India
 The Hoax (2007) – comedy-drama film recounting Irving's elaborate hoax of publishing an autobiography of Howard Hughes that he purportedly helped write, without ever having talked with Hughes
 The Home Song Stories (2007) – Australian film, an autobiographical account of Tony Ayres' (named Tom in the film) life at age eight
 Hwang Jin Yi (2007) – South Korean biographical drama film about the life of Hwang Jin Yi, the most famous courtesan (or "gisaeng") in Korean history
 I'm Not There (2007) – about the life of Bob Dylan, in which six characters embody a different aspect of the musician's life and work
 Il Pirata: Marco Pantani (2007) – Italian television film depicting real life events of road racing cyclist Marco Pantani
 In the Valley of Elah (2007) – based loosely on the homicide of returning Iraq War veteran Richard T. Davis in 2003 by fellow soldiers from Baker Company
 Into the Wild (2007) – based on the 1996 non-fiction book of the same name by Jon Krakauer about the adventures and travels of Christopher McCandless across North American and his life spent in the Alaskan wilderness in the early 1990s
 Joanne Lees: Murder in the Outback (2007) – Australian/British television film based on the real life disappearance of Peter Falconio
 Jump! (2007) – Austrian/British drama film loosely based on the real-life Halsman murder case
 Kalloori (2007) – Indian Tamil movie based on a real-life incident in which three girls were burnt to death in Dharmapuri, Tamil Nadu, India; directed by Balaji Shakthivel
 The Killing of John Lennon (2007) – biographical film about Mark David Chapman's plot to kill musician John Lennon
 The King (2007) – Australian television film examining the life of Australian entertainer Graham Kennedy
 The Kingdom (2007) – loosely based on the 1996 bombing of the Khobar housing complex and the 2003 bombing of the Riyadh compound
 Kings of South Beach (2007) – loosely based on a true story about the exploits of Chris Paciello, a transplanted New York Cityer who was involved with the Mafia back in his hometown
 La Vie en rose (2007) – French biographical musical film about the life of French singer Édith Piaf
 Las 13 rosas (2007) – Spanish film that follows the tragic fate of thirteen young women, fighting for their ideals in the aftermath of the Spanish Civil War
 Life Support (2007) – drama television film loosely based on the real-life story of Ana Wallace, an HIV-positive woman
 Lost Holiday (2007) – made-for-television film based on the true story of Jim and Suzanne Shemwell
 Lucky Miles (2007) – Australian drama film based on several true stories involving people entering Western Australia by boat to seek asylum
 The Man of Glass (Italian: L'uomo di vetro) (2007) – Italian crime drama film based on real life events of the first Sicilian Mafia's "pentito", Leonardo Vitale
 Manolete (2007) – biographical film about bullfighter Manuel Laureano Rodríguez Sánchez, better known as "Manolete"
 Maradona, the Hand of God (Spanish: Maradona – La mano de Dios) (2007) – Italian/Argentine biographical film based on real life events of footballer Diego Maradona
 Martian Child (2007) – comedy-drama film based on David Gerrold's 1994 novelette of the same name about a writer who adopts a strange young boy who believes himself to be from Mars
 Matters of Life and Dating (2007) – made-for-television based on the memoir Up Front by Linda Dackman as she re-enters the dating world after undergoing a mastectomy and breast reconstruction surgery due to cancer
 Miss Austen Regrets (2007) – made-for-television biographical film based on the life of Jane Austen
 Molière (2007) – French historical drama film about French playwright and actor Molière
 Mongol (2007) – intended to be the first in a trilogy of films based on the life of Genghis Khan
 Music Within (2007) – biographical period drama film based on the life of Richard Pimentel, a respected public speaker whose hearing disability attained in the Vietnam War drove him to become an activist for the Americans with Disabilities Act
 My Boy Jack (2007) – British biographical television film based on David Haig's 1997 play of the same name which tells the story of Rudyard Kipling and his grief for his son, John, who died in the First World War
 My Father (Korean: 마이 파더) (2007) –  South Korean  biographical period drama film based on a true story of an adopted son who is searching for his biological parents in South Korea only to find that his real father is a condemned murderer on death row
 Nightwatching (2007) – biographical film about the artist Rembrandt and the creation of his 1642 painting The Night Watch
 Operace Silver A (2007) – Czech two-part television film inspired by a real war operation of the same name from the beginning of 1942
 Periyar (2007) – Indian Tamil biographical film based on the life of social reformer and rationalist Periyar E. V. Ramasamy
 Persepolis (2007) –  adult animated biographical drama film based upon Marjane Satrapi's autobiographical graphic novel of the same name
 Piano, solo (2007) – Italian drama film depicting the real life events of jazz pianist and composer Luca Flores
 The Pope's Toilet (Spanish: El Baño del Papa) (2007) – Uruguayan film about the 1988 visit of Pope John Paul II at Melo, a Uruguayan town on the Brazilian border
 Pride (2007) – based loosely on the true story of Philadelphia swim coach Jim Ellis and his African American swim team in 1974 Philadelphia
 Primeval (2007) – based on tales of a real man-eating crocodile named Gustave, still living in Burundi
 Protecting the King (2007) – drama film telling the story of David Stanley, the stepbrother and bodyguard of singer Elvis Presley
 PVC-1 (2007) – Colombian drama film inspired by a true story about a pipe bomb improvised explosive device (IED) that was placed around the neck of an extortion victim
 Redacted (2007) – war film, a fictional dramatization, loosely based on the 2006 Mahmudiyah killings in Mahmoudiyah, Iraq, when U.S. Army soldiers raped an Iraqi girl and murdered her along with her family 
 Rise of the Footsoldier (2007) – British gangster film based on the true story of the Rettendon murders and the autobiography of Carlton Leach, a former football hooligan of the infamous Inter City Firm, who became a powerful figure of the English underworld
 Rogue (2007) – inspired by the true story of Sweetheart, a giant male saltwater crocodile that attacked boats in the late 1970s, although Sweetheart was never responsible for an attack on a human
 Romulus, My Father (2007) – Australian drama film based on the memoir by Raimond Gaita, the film tells the story of Romulus and his wife Christine, and their struggle in the face of great adversity to raise their son, Raimond
 Satham Podathey (2007) – Indian Tamil psychological thriller film based on a true story
 Savage Grace (2007) – French/Spanish/American drama film based on the book Savage Grace by Natalie Robins and Steven M.L. Aronson, about the dysfunctional, allegedly incestuous relationship between heiress and socialite Barbara Daly Baekeland and her son, Antony
 Say It in Russian (2007) – American/French film about an American businessman who hooks up with a young Russian girl who turns out to be the daughter of a rich Russian mafia oligarch. The poster of the film claims it's a true story
 September Dawn (2007) – based on the 7–11 September 1857, Mountain Meadows massacre
 Shake Hands with the Devil (2007) – Canadian war drama film based on Roméo Dallaire's autobiography recounting his harrowing personal journey during the 1994 Rwandan genocide and how the United Nations failed to heed Dallaire's urgent pleas for further assistance to halt the massacre
 Shoot on Sight (2007) – British film based on Operation Kratos, and the shooting of an innocent Brazilian on 22 July 2005 whom police thought to be a Muslim terrorist about to detonate a suicide bomb
 Shootout at Lokhandwala (2007) – Hindi film based on the 1991 Lokhandwala Complex shootout, a real-life gun battle between gangsters and Mumbai Police during an encounter with gangster Maya Dolas
 Sinners (2007) – true story about three young men who set off to avenge their sins
 The Sovereign's Servant (Russian: Sluga Gosudarev) (2007) – Russian swashbuckler film depicting the events of the Great Northern War, with a particular focus on the Battle of Poltava
 St. Giuseppe Moscati: Doctor to the Poor (Italian: Giuseppe Moscati – L'amore che guarisce) (2007) – Italian television film based on real life events of doctor and then Roman Catholic Saint Giuseppe Moscati
 The Staircase murders (2007) – television film telling the story of Michael Peterson, who was convicted in 2003 of killing his wife by beating her over the head
 Stuck (2007) – loosely based on the hit and run committed by Chante Jawan Mallard, who left her victim Gregory Glenn Biggs to die slowly in her garage
 Sybil (2007) – true story based on the life of Shirley Ardell Mason, who was diagnosed with multiple personality disorder
 Talk To Me (2007) – based on the life of Washington, D.C., radio personality Ralph "Petey" Greene
 Theresa: The Body of Christ (Spanish: Teresa, el cuerpo de Cristo) (2007) – French/Spanish/British biographical film about Saint Teresa of Ávila
 Trainwreck: My Life as an Idiot (also known as: American Loser,) (2007) – comedy-drama film based upon the autobiographical book The Little Yellow Bus by Jeff Nichols
 Václav (2007) – Czech drama film inspired by the true story of an autistic person
 Voice of a Murderer (Korean: Geunom moksori) (2007) – South Korean crime thriller-drama film, a fictionalized account of a real-life kidnapping case in 1991
 What We Do Is Secret (2007) – based on the 1970s Los Angeles punk band the Germs and their lead singer Darby Crash
 Zodiac (2007) – based on the story of the Zodiac Killer

2008 
 21 (2008) – inspired by the story of the MIT Blackjack Team
 Accidental Friendship (2008) – based on a true story of a homeless woman with her two pets as her only friends
 Admiral (Russian: Адмиралъ) (2008) – Russian biographical film about Alexander Kolchak, a vice-admiral in the Imperial Russian Navy and leader of the anti-communist White Movement during the Russian Civil War
 Adoration (2008) – Canadian drama film based partly on the 1986 Hindawi affair
 The Alphabet Killer (2008) – thriller-horror film loosely based on the Alphabet murders that took place in Rochester, New York between 1971 and 1973
 Amália (2008) – Portuguese biographical film about legendary Portuguese fado singer Amália Rodrigues
 American Violet (2008) – based on Regina Kelly, a victim of Texas police drug enforcement tactics
 The Baader Meinhof Complex (German: Der Baader Meinhof Komplex) (2008) – German/French/Czech production based on German militant group the Red Army Faction, retells the story of the early years of the RAF, concentrating on its beginnings in 1967 (at the time of the German student movement) up to the German Autumn (Deutscher Herbst) of 1977
 Baby Blues (2008) – based on Andrea Yates, who drowned her five children in 2001 in a severe case of postpartum psychosis
 The Bank Job (2008) – based on a 1971 London Baker Street robbery allegedly concocted by MI5
 Billy: The Early Years (2008) – biographical film telling the story of the early life of evangelist Billy Graham
 Bloedbroeders ( Blood Brothers) (2008) – Dutch television film based on the Baarn murder case, which took place between 1960 and 1963
 Bottle Shock (2008) – comedy-drama film based on the 1976 wine competition termed the "Judgment of Paris", when California wine defeated French wine in a blind taste test
 Bronson (2008) – fictionalized and based on the life of Britain's most violent prisoner Michael Gordon Peterson, better known as Charles Bronson
 Cadillac Records (2008) – based on the life of influential Chicago-based record company executive Leonard Chess and the singers who recorded for Chess Records
 Camino (2008) – Spanish drama film inspired by the real story of Alexia González-Barros, a girl who died from spinal cancer at age 14 in 1985 and who is in process of canonization
 Cape No. 7 (Chinese: Hǎijiǎo Qī Hào) (2008) – Chinese film based on a report about a Taiwanese postman who successfully delivered a piece of mail addressed in the old Japanese style; the sender was the former Japanese employer of the recipient
 Cass (2008) – British crime drama film based on the true story of the life of Cass Pennant
 Changeling (2008) – loosely based on the real-life Wineville Chicken Coop murders, involving Christine Collins and the disappearance of her son
 Chapter 27 (2008) – biographical drama film depicting the murder of John Lennon by Mark David Chapman
 Che (2008) – a merged version of two films: The Argentine and Guerrilla, about the life of Marxist revolutionary, Che Guevara
 The Children of Huang Shi (2008) – Australian/Chinese/German historical war drama film centering on the true story of George Hogg and the sixty orphans that he led across China in an effort to save them from conscription during the Second Sino-Japanese war
 The Christmas Choir (2008) – American/Canadian made-for-television Christmas drama film based upon a true story of a man who volunteered to work at a homeless shelter and started a choir with its residents
 Clubbed (2008) – British drama film based on Geoff Thompson's autobiography Watch My Back
 Coco Chanel (2008) – biographical drama television film about Coco Chanel
 The Curse of Steptoe (2008) – made-for-television based on Harry H. Corbett and Wilfrid Brambell's on- and off-screen relationship during the making of the BBC sitcom Steptoe and Son
 December Heat (Estonian: Detsembrikuumus) (2008) – Estonian historic action drama about the 1924 Estonian coup d'état attempt
 Defiance (2008) – the story of the Bielski partisans
 The Duchess (2008) – based on the life of Georgiana Cavendish, Duchess of Devonshire
 The Easy Way (French: Sans arme, ni haine, ni violence) – French heist film based on the real life thief Albert Spaggiari, who organized a break-in into a Société Générale bank in Nice, France in 1976
 The Edge of Love (2008) – British biographical romantic drama film loosely based on Welsh poet Dylan Thomas and his wife Caitlin Macnamara 
 Everlasting Moments (Swedish: Maria Larssons eviga ögonblick) (2008) – Swedish drama based on the true story of Maria Larsson, a Swedish working-class woman in the early 20th century who wins a camera in a lottery and goes on to become a photographer
 The Express: The Ernie Davis Story (2008) – based on the life of "The Elmira Express" Ernie Davis, the first African American to win the Heisman Trophy
 Fab Five: The Texas Cheerleader Scandal (2008) – teen drama television film based on real-life events that occurred at McKinney North High School in McKinney, Texas, in 2006, five teenage cheerleaders became notorious for truancies, violations of the school dress code, and general disrespect to the school community
 Felon (2008) – based on events at California State Prison, Corcoran in the 1990s
 Fifty Dead Men Walking (2008) – loose adaptation of Martin McGartland's 1997 autobiography of the same name
 Flame & Citron (Danish: Flammen & Citronen) (2008) – Danish film based on the lives of Bent Faurschou-Hviid and Jørgen Haagen Schmith, members of the Holger Danske, a Danish resistance group in Nazi-occupied Denmark
 Flash of Genius (2008) – the story of Robert Kearns, inventor of the intermittent windshield wiper and his claims and lawsuit against Ford Motor Company
 Forever Enthralled (Chinese: 梅蘭芳) (2008) – Chinese biographical film depicting the life of Mei Lanfang, one of China's premiere opera performers
 Forever the Moment (Korean: Uri saengae choego-ui sungan) (2008) – South Korean fictionalized account of the achievements of the South Korean women's national handball team at the 2004 Summer Olympics
 Front of the Class (2008) – biographical drama film based on Brad Cohen's life with Tourette syndrome and how it inspired him to teach other students
 Frost/Nixon (2008) – the story of the 1977 televised Frost/Nixon interviews
 Gomorrah (2008) – Italian crime film based on the non-fiction book of the same name by Roberto Saviano, which documents Saviano's infiltration and investigation of various areas of business and daily life controlled or affected by criminal organization Camorra
 Haber (2008) – the work of Fritz Haber in developing chemical weaponry for the German army during World War I
 Hansie (2008) – South African film based on the true story of cricketer Hansie Cronje
 House of Saddam (2008) – British biographical miniseries about the rise and fall of Saddam Hussein 
 How to Lose Friends & Alienate People (2008) – British comedy film based upon Toby Young's 2001 memoir How to Lose Friends & Alienate People
 Hunger (2008) – based on Bobby Sands and the 1981 Irish hunger strike
 The Hurt Locker (2008) – Oscar-winning war film about a three-man explosive ordnance disposal team during the Iraq War
 Il divo (2008) – Italian biographical drama film based on the figure of former Italian Prime Minister Giulio Andreotti
 Ip Man (2008) – Hong Kong film based on the life of "Ip Man", a grandmaster of the martial art Wing Chun and master of Bruce Lee
 Jodhaa Akbar (2008) – Indian epic historical romance film based on the life of Mughal emperor Akbar the Great
 John Adams (2008) – miniseries chronicling most of U.S. President John Adams's political life and his role in the founding of the United States
 The Kautokeino Rebellion (Norwegian: Kautokeino-opprøret) (2008) – Norwegian film based on the true story of the Kautokeino riots in Kautokeino, Norway in 1852 in response to the Norwegian exploitation of the Sami community at that time
 The Last Confession of Alexander Pearce (2008) – Australian-Irish biographical drama film following the final days of Irish convict and bushranger Alexander Pearce's life as he awaits execution
 Last Stop 174 (Portuguese: Última Parada 174) (2008) – Brazilian film relating a fictionalized account of the life of Sandro Rosa do Nascimento, a street kid in Rio de Janeiro that survived the Candelária massacre and, in 2000, hijacked a bus
 Lemon Tree (Hebrew: Etz Limon) (2008) – Israeli/German/French film partly based on a real-life incident of an Israeli Defense Minister who moves to the border within Israel and the occupied territories and security forces began cutting down the lemon trees beside his house, arguing that it could be used by terrorists as a hiding place
 Little Ashes (2008) – Spanish-British biographical drama film three of the era's most creative young talents, Luis Buñuel, Salvador Dalí and Federico García Lorca, meet at university and set off on a course to change their world
 Little Girl Lost: The Delimar Vera Story (2008) – based on the events surrounding the kidnapping and rescue of Delimar Vera, who was kidnapped just ten days after she was born
 Living Proof (2008) – based on the true life story of Denny Slamon, who helped develop the breast cancer drug Herceptin 2
 The Longshots (2008) – comedy-drama sports film based on the real life events of Jasmine Plummer, the first female to participate in the Pop Warner football tournament
 Love Exposure (Japanese: Ai no mukidashi) (2008) – Japanese comedy-drama art film about the true story of a love triangle between a young Catholic upskirt photographer, a misandric girl and a manipulative cultist
 Machan (2008) – Italian/Sri Lankan comedy film inspired by the true story of a fake Sri Lankan national handball team that tricked its way into a German tournament, lost all of their matches, and subsequently vanished
 Mao's Last Dancer (2008) – Australian film based on professional dancer Li Cunxin's 2003 memoir of the same name
 Marley & Me (2008) – based on the memoir of the same title by journalist John Grogan
 Max Manus (2008) – Norwegian biographic war film based on real events in the life of resistance fighter Max Manus, who helped to save his country from the Germans during World War II
 Mesrine (2008) – French two-part biographical crime film on the life of French gangster Jacques Mesrine
 Meu Nome Não É Johnny (2008) – Brazilian biographical film based on the true story of João Guilherme Estrella, an upper-middle-class man from the State of Rio de Janeiro that would become the head of the drug traffic in the late 1980s and early 1990s
 Milk (2008) – based on the life of Harvey Milk, the first openly gay man elected to public office in California
 Mogadischu (2008) – German made-for-TV thriller film chronicling the events surrounding the hijacking of Lufthansa Flight 181 by the Popular Front for the Liberation of Palestine in 1977
 North Face (German: Nordwand) (2008) – German film about the 1936 attempt by Toni Kurz and Andreas Hinterstoisser to summit the Eiger via the north face
 The Ode (2008) – Indian/American adaptation of the novel, Ode to Lata, based on actual events
 The Other Boleyn Girl (2008) – based on the lives of sisters Anne and Mary Boleyn, who compete for the affection of King Henry VIII
 Oye Lucky! Lucky Oye! (2008) – Indian comedy film inspired by the real life shenanigans of Devinder Singh, alias Bunty, a real-life "super-chor", originally from Vikaspuri, Delhi
 Pattenrai!! ~ Minami no Shima no Mizu Monogatari (Japanese: パッテンライ!!　～南の島の水ものがたり) (2008) – Japanese anime biographical film portraying the career of Yoichi Hatta, a civil engineer active in Japanese Taiwan, and his interactions with the native Taiwanese
 The Poker House (2008) – based on director Lori Petty's own early life during the mid-1970s
 Portrait of a Beauty (Korean: 미인도) (2008) – South Korean fictionalized portrayal based on Joseon-era painter Shin Yun-bok (better known by his pen name, Hyewon) as being a woman disguised as a man
 Racing for Time (2008) – Lifetime television film based on the accomplishment of real life coach and prison guard Sergeant Noel Chestnut (later promoted to lieutenant) and the Ventura Youth Correctional Facility's track team he started
 Ramchand Pakistani (2008) – Pakistani drama film based on a true story of a boy who inadvertently crosses the border between Pakistan and India and the following ordeal that his family has to go through
 The Red Baron (German: Der rote Baron) (2008) – German/British biographical action war film about the World War I fighter pilot Manfred von Richthofen, known as the "Red Baron"
 Red Cliff: Part I (Chinese: 赤壁) (2008) – Chinese epic war film, based on the Battle of Red Cliffs (208–209 AD) and the events at the end of the Han dynasty
 Rivals (French: Les Liens du sang) (2008) – French action film inspired by the story of the Bruno brothers; one a pimp and the other a cop
 Sagan (2008) – French biographical film about French author Françoise Sagan's road to fame, her drug abuse, alcoholism, and gambling, her hedonistic lifestyle spending too much and becoming poor, as well as several complex love affairs with both men and women
 Séraphine (2008) – French-Belgian biographical film based on Séraphine Louis's life 
 Sex and Lies in Sin City (2008) – Lifetime Television film detailing the events surrounding the death of Las Vegas casino owner Ted Binion
 The Sicilian Girl (Italian: La siciliana ribelle) (2008) – Italian film inspired by the story of Rita Atria, a key witness in a major Mafia investigation in Sicily
 Silent Wedding (Romanian: Nunta mută) (2008) – Romanian comedy-drama film about a young couple who has to celebrate their marriage in silence because the Soviet leader Joseph Stalin had died the night before
 Skin (2008) – British-South African biographical film about Sandra Laing, a South African woman born to white parents, who was classified as "Coloured" during the apartheid era, presumably due to a genetic case of atavism
 Stone of Destiny (2008) – the story of attorney Ian Hamilton, who helped recapture the Stone of Scone for Scotland
 The Stoning of Soraya M. (2008) – the story of Soraya Manutchehri, a victim of stoning in Iran
 Touching Home (2008) – drama film about two brothers who pursue a professional baseball career and their relationship with their father 
 The Two Mr. Kissels (2008) – made-for-television true crime drama film chronicling the lives and murders of brothers Robert and Andrew Kissel
 Valkyrie (2008) – the story of the 20 July plot in 1944 by German army officers to assassinate Adolf Hitler and to use the Operation Valkyrie national emergency plan to take control of the country
 W. (2008) – based on the life and presidency of George W. Bush
 What Doesn't Kill You (2008) – crime drama loosely based on the true life story of the film's director Brian Goodman, detailing his own exploits involved with South Boston's Irish Mob
 The Wave (German: Die Welle) (2008) – German socio-political thriller film based on Ron Jones' social experiment The Third Wave and Todd Strasser's novel, The Wave
 Worlds Apart (Danish: To verdener) (2008) – Danish drama film based upon the true story of a 17-year-old Jehovah's Witness girl who struggles to reconcile her faith and her secret romance with a non-believer boy

2009 
 3 Acts of Murder (2009) – Australian television film based on the true life story of how author Arthur Upfield inadvertently inspired The Murchison murders
 12 Paces Without a Head (German: Zwölf Meter ohne Kopf) (2009) – German film based on the life of Klaus Störtebeker
 12 Winter (German: Zwölf Winter) (2009) – German television film based on the true story of two bank robbers who robbed a series of small banks throughout Germany for more than 12 years before they were captured in August 2002
 Accident on Hill Road (2009) – based on Chante Mallard, a Texas, woman convicted and sentenced to 50 years' imprisonment for her role in the death of a 37-year-old homeless man
 Agora (2009) – Spanish English-language historical drama film about Hypatia, a mathematician, philosopher and astronomer in late 4th-century Roman Egypt, who investigates the flaws of the geocentric Ptolemaic system and the heliocentric model that challenges it
 Amelia (2009) – a look at the life of legendary American pilot Amelia Earhart, who disappeared while flying over the Pacific Ocean in 1937 in an attempt to circumnavigate the globe
 An Englishman in New York (2009) – biographical film chronicling the years gay English writer Quentin Crisp spent in New York City
 April Showers (2009) – independent film inspired by the 1999 Columbine High School shooting and the days that followed
 The Assailant (2009) – Brazilian action drama film about Besouro Mangangá, a Brazilian Capoeirista from the early 1920s, to whom were attributed some heroic and legendary deeds
 Balibo (2009) – Australian war film that follows the story of the Balibo Five, a group of journalists who were captured and killed while reporting on activities just prior to the Indonesian invasion of East Timor of 1975
 Barbarossa (2009) – Italian English-language film set primarily in northern Italy during the late 12th century, concerning with the struggle of the Lombard League, which struggled to maintain independence from the Holy Roman Empire, led by the legendary Guelph warrior Alberto da Giussano
 Berdella (2009) – horror film based on the crimes of Missouri serial killer Robert Berdella
 Berlin 36 (2009) – German film telling the fate of Jewish track and field athlete Gretel Bergmann in the 1936 Summer Olympics
 The Blind Side (2009) – adapted from the 2006 Michael Lewis book The Blind Side: Evolution of a Game, focusing on the life of future NFL player Michael Oher
 The Boys Are Back (2009) – Australian/British drama film based on the 2000 book, The Boys Are Back in Town, by Simon Carr, about a sports writer who becomes a single parent in tragic circumstances
 Bright Star (2009) – drama based on the three-year romance between 19th-century poet John Keats and Fanny Brawne, which was cut short by Keats' untimely death at age 25
 Broken Promise (Slovak: Nedodržaný sľub) (2009) – Slovak/Czech/American drama film depicting the fate of a Jewish boy, Martin Friedmann, who has to avoid being transported to extermination camps in order to survive in World War II
 Coco avant Chanel (2009) – about fashion designer Coco Chanel before she was famous
 Coco Chanel & Igor Stravinsky (2009) – French romantic drama film based on a rumoured affair between Coco Chanel and Igor Stravinsky in Paris in 1920, the year that Chanel No. 5 was created
 The Consul of Sodom (Spain: El Cónsul de Sodoma) (2009) – Spanish biographical film about the Catalan poet Jaime Gil de Biedma
 The Countess (2009) –  French-German historical crime thriller drama film based on the life of the notorious Hungarian countess Elizabeth Báthory
 The Courageous Heart of Irena Sendler (2009) – television film based on the 2007 biography Die Mutter der Holocaust-Kinder: Irena Sendler und die geretteten Kinder aus dem Warschauer Ghetto, that focuses on Irena Sendler, a Polish social worker who smuggled approximately 2,500 Jewish children to safety during World War II
 Creation (2009) – British biographical drama film about Charles Darwin's relationship with his wife Emma and his memory of their eldest daughter Annie, as he struggles to write On the Origin of Species
 The Damned United (2009) – British sports film based on Brian Clough's tenure as Leeds United's manager
 Deadliest Sea (2009) – Canadian television film about the crew of the Kodiak, Alaska-based scallop fishing vessel St. Christopher
 Desert Flower (2009) – German biographical film based on the Somali-born model Waris Dirie's autobiography
 Don't Burn (Vietnamese: Đừng Đốt) (2009) – Vietnamese biographical film based on the diary of North Vietnamese doctor Đặng Thùy Trâm
 The Donner Party (2009) – period Western drama film based on the true story of the Donner Party, an 1840s westward traveling group of settlers headed for California. Becoming snowbound in the Sierra Nevada mountains, with food increasingly scarce, a small group calling themselves "The Forlorn Hope" turned to cannibalism
 Endgame (2009) – British film dramatizing the final days of apartheid in South Africa
 Enid (2009) – British biographical made-for-television film based on the life of children's writer Enid Blyton
 Everyman's War (2009) – based on the Battle of the Bulge during World War II
 Farewell (French: L'affaire Farewell) (2009) – French espionage thriller film loosely based on the actions of the high-ranking KGB official, Vladimir Vetrov
 Felicitas (2009) – Argentine romantic drama film based on the life of Argentine actress, screenwriter, producer and film director Felicitas Guerrero
 Formosa Betrayed (2009) – political thriller which depicts the KMT government's intentional wipe-out of the Taiwan people's opposition voices in the 1980s, inspired by two actual events – one the death of Professor Chen Wen-chen of Carnegie Mellon University in 1981, and the other the 1984 assassination of (American-citizen) journalist Henry Liu in California
 Fort Apache Napoli (Italian: Fortapàsc) (2009) – Italian biographical film about the fight against the Camorra and subsequent assassination of journalist Giancarlo Siani
 Georgia O'Keeffe (2009) – made-for-television biographical drama film about American painter Georgia O'Keeffe
 Get Low (2009) – drama film about a Tennessee hermit in the 1930s who throws his own funeral party while still alive, loosely based on the story of Felix Bushaloo "Uncle Bush" Breazeale
 Gifted Hands: The Ben Carson Story (2009) – based on the life of Ben Carson, who grew up to become a neurosurgeon at Johns Hopkins and the first surgeon to separate conjoined twins
 The Girl on the Train (French: La fille du RER) (2009) – French drama film inspired by the true story of a woman in her twenties who walked into a police station in Paris on 9 July 2004 claiming she had been the victim of an antisemitic attack on a suburban RER train
 Goemon (2009) – Japanese historical fantasy film based on the story of Ishikawa Goemon, a legendary outlaw hero who stole valuables from the rich and gave them to the poor
 Grey Gardens (2009) – biographical drama television film about the lives of Edith Bouvier Beale and her mother Edith Ewing Bouvier 
 Hachi: A Dog's Tale (2009) – based on the faithful Akita Hachikō, remake of the Japanese film Hachikō Monogatari, and now set in the United States
 Held Hostage (2009) – Lifetime Movie based on the true story of Michelle Renee Ramskill-Estey, a single mother who is kidnapped by three masked men and held hostage until she is forced to rob a bank
 Hilde (2009) – German biographical film depicting the life of the German actress Hildegard Knef
 Hurricane Season (2009) – sports drama film based on the true story of John Ehret High School's 2005–06 State championship team
 I Hope They Serve Beer in Hell (2009) – independent comedy film loosely based on the work and persona of writer Tucker Max, who co-wrote the screenplay
 I Love You Phillip Morris (2009) – black comedy drama film based on the 1980s and 1990s real-life story con artist, imposter and multiple prison escapee Steven Jay Russell
 In Her Skin (2009) – Australian drama based on the brutal murder of 15-year-old Melbourne girl Rachel Barber, who went missing on 1 March 1999
 In the Beginning (2009) – French drama film about the true story of Philippe Berre, a Frenchman with a reputation as an impostor
 The Informant! (2009) – based on the real-life story of Mark Whitacre, the highest-ranked executive in U.S. history to turn whistleblower
 Ingenious (2009) – based on the rags-to-riches story of two friends, a small-time inventor and a sharky salesman, who hit rock bottom before coming up with a gizmo that becomes a worldwide phenomenon
 The Interrogation (Finnish: Kuulustelu) (2009) – Finnish war drama film focusing on the interrogation of Soviet intelligence agent Kerttu Nuorteva
 Into the Storm (2009) – British-American biographical film about Winston Churchill and his days in office during the Second World War
 Invictus (2009) – based on the real-life story of South African president Nelson Mandela and François Pienaar, the captain of the Springboks, the South African rugby union team
 John Rabe (2009) – German/Chinese/French biographical film focusing on the experiences of John Rabe, a German businessman who used his Nazi Party membership to create a protective International Safety Zone in Nanking, China, helping to save over 200,000 Chinese from the Nanking massacre in late 1937 and early 1938
 Julie & Julia (2009) – comedy drama contrasting the lives of two food writers: pioneer chef Julia Child in the 1940s and 21st-century New Yorker Julie Powell, who aspires to cook all 524 recipes in Child's cookbook in 365 days
 Kerala Varma Pazhassi Raja (2009) – Indian Malayalam-language historical drama film based on the life of Pazhassi Raja, a Hindu king who fought against the British in the 18th century
 The Killing Room (2009) – psychological thriller based on the Project MKUltra programme by the CIA, with fictionalized characters
 The Last Station (2009) – German English-language biographical drama film based on Jay Parini's 1990 biographical novel of the same name, which chronicled the final months of Leo Tolstoy's life
 The Least Among You (2009) – based on the true story of Rev. Dr. Charles Marks' formative years
 Lula, Son of Brazil (Portuguese: Lula: O Filho do Brasil) (2009) – Brazilian film based on the life of Brazilian president Luiz Inácio Lula da Silva
 Mao's Last Dancer (2009) – based on the autobiography of ballet dancer Li Cunxin
 Margaret (2009) – made-for-television film fictionalising of the life of Margaret Thatcher and her fall from the premiership in the 1990 leadership election
 Middle Men (2009) – drama film based on the experiences of Christopher Mallick, who was previously associated with the Internet billing companies Paycom and ePassporte and was accused of stealing millions of dollars from his customers at ePassporte
 The Mighty Macs (2009) – sport drama film regarding Cathy Rush, a Hall of Fame women's basketball coach
 Moonshot (2009) – British television film about the events leading up to the Apollo 11 spaceflight
 Mulan (Chinese: 花木蘭) (2009) – Chinese action war film based on the life of Hua Mulan
 My Son, My Son, What Have Ye Done (2009) – American/German crime drama film loosely based on the story of Mark Yavorsky, an actor at the University of San Diego who reenacted a scene from Orestes by murdering his mother with an antique saber
 Natalee Holloway (2009) – made-for-television film based on the disappearance of Natalee Holloway
 Notorious (2009) – depiction of the life and career of rapper Biggie Smalls/The Notorious B.I.G.
 Nowhere Boy (2009) – British biographical drama film about John Lennon's adolescence, his relationships with his aunt Mimi Smith and his mother Julia Lennon, the creation of his first band, the Quarrymen, and its evolution into the Beatles
 The Perfect Game (2009) – drama film based on the events leading to the 1957 Little League World Series, which was won by the first team from outside the United States, the Industrial Little League of Monterrey, Mexico
 Phantom Punch (2009) – biographical film based on the life of Sonny Liston
 Pope Joan (German: Die Päpstin) (2009) – biographical epic film based on American novelist Donna Woolfolk Cross novel of the same name about the legendary Pope Joan
 Prayers for Bobby (2009) – the true story of gay rights crusader Mary Griffith, whose teenage son committed suicide due to her religious intolerance, based on the book of the same title by Leroy F. Aarons
 Prince of Tears (2009) – Taiwanese historical drama film telling the story of a family embroiled in the tragic "White Terror" suppression of political dissidents that was wrought during the 1950s by the Kuomintang government (KMT) after their acquisition of Taiwan in the 1940s
 Princess Kaiulani – biographical drama film based on the life of Princess Kaiulani of the Kingdom of Hawaiʻi
 Public Enemies (2009) – biographical crime film in which the FBI tries to take down notorious American gangsters John Dillinger, Baby Face Nelson and Pretty Boy Floyd during a booming crime wave in the 1930s
 Purple Sea (Italian: Viola di mare, also known as The Sea Purple) (2009) – Italian romance drama film based on the non-fiction novel Minchia di re written by Giacomo Pilati, telling the love story between Angela and Sara in 19th-century Sicily
 Safe Harbor (2009) – television film based on the beginnings of the Safe Harbor Boys Home, a residential educational program for at risk teenaged boys on the Saint Johns River in Jacksonville, Florida, founded by Doug and Robbie Smith
 Same Same But Different (2009) – German film, a love story following Benjamin Prüfer's 2006 autobiographical magazine article, later published as a novel in 2007, about a 21-year-old bar girl in Phnom Penh and Ben, a young German student traveler
 Sister Smile (French: Sœur Sourire) (2009) – biographical drama film based on Jeannine Deckers, also known as The Singing Nun
 The Soloist (2009) – based on the life of Nathaniel Ayers, a musician who developed schizophrenia and became homeless
 The Spell (2009) – British horror film about a young woman that begins to dabble in witchcraft but soon gets in over her head, loosely based on the true story of Emma Whale
 Stoic (2009) – Canadian arthouse drama film centering on a true incident which occurred in Siegburg prison in 2006 where three prisoners raped, tortured and ultimately forced their cellmate to commit suicide over a period of ten hours in a series of events that began with a poker bet involving the consumption of a tube of toothpaste
 The Stoneman murders (2009) – Indian Hindi neo-noir crime thriller film based on the real life Stoneman serial killings, which made headlines in the early 1980s in Mumbai
 Taken in Broad Daylight (2009) – television film based on the real-life kidnapping of Nebraska teenager Anne Sluti, who was abducted and held for six days in April 2001 by Anthony Steven Wright, also known as Tony Zappa
 Taking Chance (2009) – based on the experiences of Lt. Col. Michael Strobl, who escorted the body of Marine Chance Phelps back to his hometown from Iraq
 Taking Woodstock (2009) – comedy based on the Woodstock Festival of 1969
 Too Late to Say Goodbye (2009) – American/Canadian television film based on the 2007 true crime book of the same name by Ann Rule
 Tsar (2009) – Russian drama film set between the years 1566 and 1569 during the era of the Oprichnina and the Livonian War
 Van Diemen's Land (2009) – thriller set in 1822 in colonial Tasmania following the story of the infamous Irish convict, Alexander Pearce
 Vincere (2009) – Italian film based on the life of Benito Mussolini's first wife, Ida Dalser
 Vision (German: Vision – Aus dem Leben der Hildegard von Bingen) (2009) – German film depicting the story of Hildegard of Bingen, the famed 12th century Benedictine nun, Christian mystic, composer, philosopher, playwright, physician, poet, naturalist, scientist and ecological activist 
 Wesley (2009) – biographical film about John Wesley and Charles Wesley, the founders of the Methodist movement
 Winter of Frozen Dreams (2009) – independent crime drama following the story of Barbara Hoffman, a Wisconsin biochemistry student and prostitute convicted of murder in the first televised murder trial ever
 The Young Victoria (2009) – dramatization of the turbulent first years of Queen Victoria's rule, and her enduring romance with Prince Albert
 Zen (Japanese: 禅) (2009) – Japanese biographical film about Dōgen Zenji, a Japanese Zen Buddhist teacher

External links 
 History at the Movies: Historical and Period Films
 Internet Movie Database list
 Films based on historical events and people

References

 
Actual events
Lists of historical films